= 21 Ángeles (TransMilenio) =

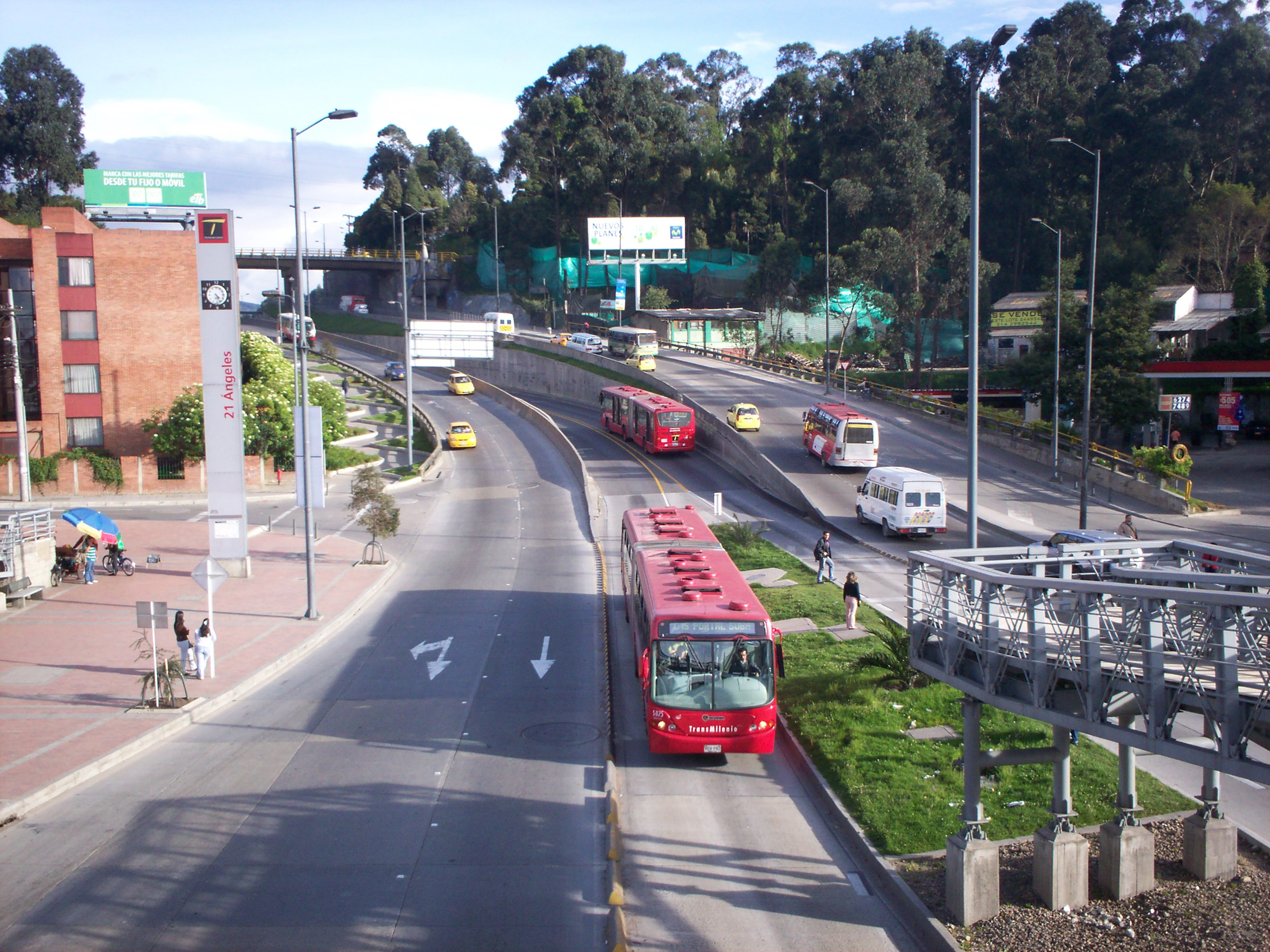

General information
- Location: Suba, Bogotá; Colombia

History
- Opened: April 29, 2006

Services
Preceding station	TransMilenio	Following station
Gratamira towards Portal de Suba	C	Suba Transversal 91 towards San Martín
Location

The simple station 21 Ángeles is part of the TransMilenio mass-transit system of Bogotá, Colombia, which opened in the year 2000.

== Location ==
The station is located in northwestern Bogotá, specifically on Avenida Suba with Transversal 84.

The station serves the demand of the Los Pinos area, Las Terrazas, as well as the Altos de Chozica and Provenza neighborhoods.

A few blocks away is the bridge that connects the two hills of Suba, separated by the avenue (Transversal 66 or 81).

== History ==
In 2006, phase two of the TransMilenio system was completed, including the Avenida Suba line, on which this station is located.

The station is named 21 Ángeles due to its proximity to the site where 21 students of the Agustianio Norte school were killed on April 28, 2004 when the bus on which they were riding was crushed by a construction vehicle that was on the higher road. The roads in this area are at different heights due to the difficult, mountainous terrain.

== Station Services ==
=== Main line service ===
Service as of April 29, 2006
Type	Northern routes	Northwestern routes	Southern routes	Frequency
Local		7	7	Every 3 minutes
Express Monday through Saturday all day		C15	H15	Every two minutes
Express Monday through Saturday; Mixed service, rush and non-rush	B50	C61		Every two minutes

=== Dual services ===
Services rendered since April 15, 2014
Kind	Northern routes	Eastern routes
Dual Monday to Sunday all day	C84	M84

=== Special Services ===
The following special route also works:

- T08 to the Tuna Alta neighborhood.

=== Inter-city service ===
This station does not have inter-city service.

== See also ==
- Bogotá
- TransMilenio
- List of TransMilenio Stations
