= Puente Largo (TransMilenio) =

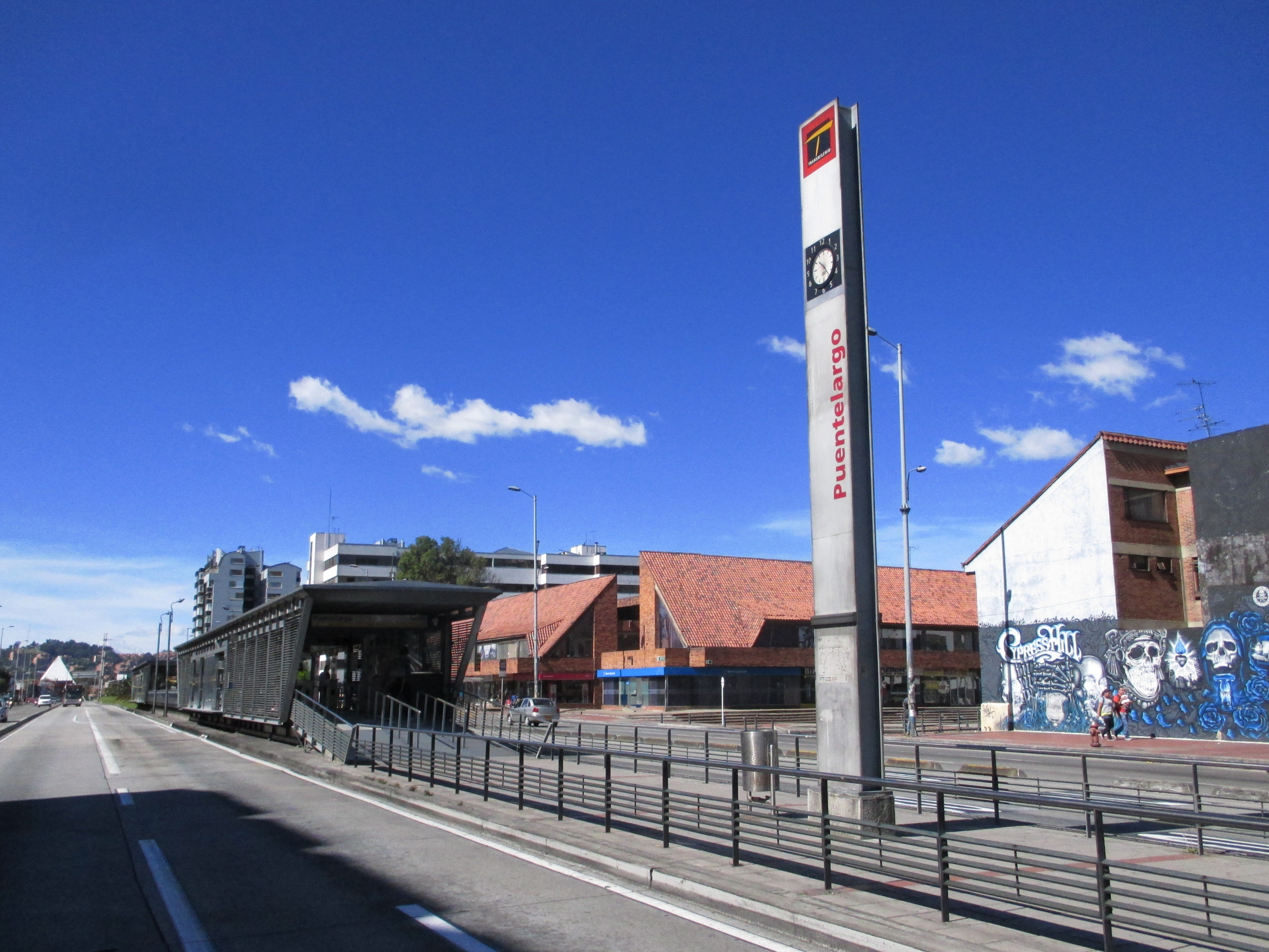

General information
- Location: Suba (Bogotá); Colombia

History
- Opened: April 29, 2006

Services
| Preceding station | TransMilenio | Following station |
|---|---|---|
| Av. Suba Calle 116 towards Portal de Suba | C | Suba Calle 100 towards San Martín |

The simple station Puente Largo is part of the TransMilenio mass-transit system of Bogotá, Colombia, which opened in the year 2000.

== Location ==
The station is located in northwestern Bogotá, specifically on Avenida Suba with Transversal 44.

It serves the Puente Largo, Ilarco, and Andes Norte neighborhoods.

Nearby is the Fray Bartolomé de las Casas medical center.

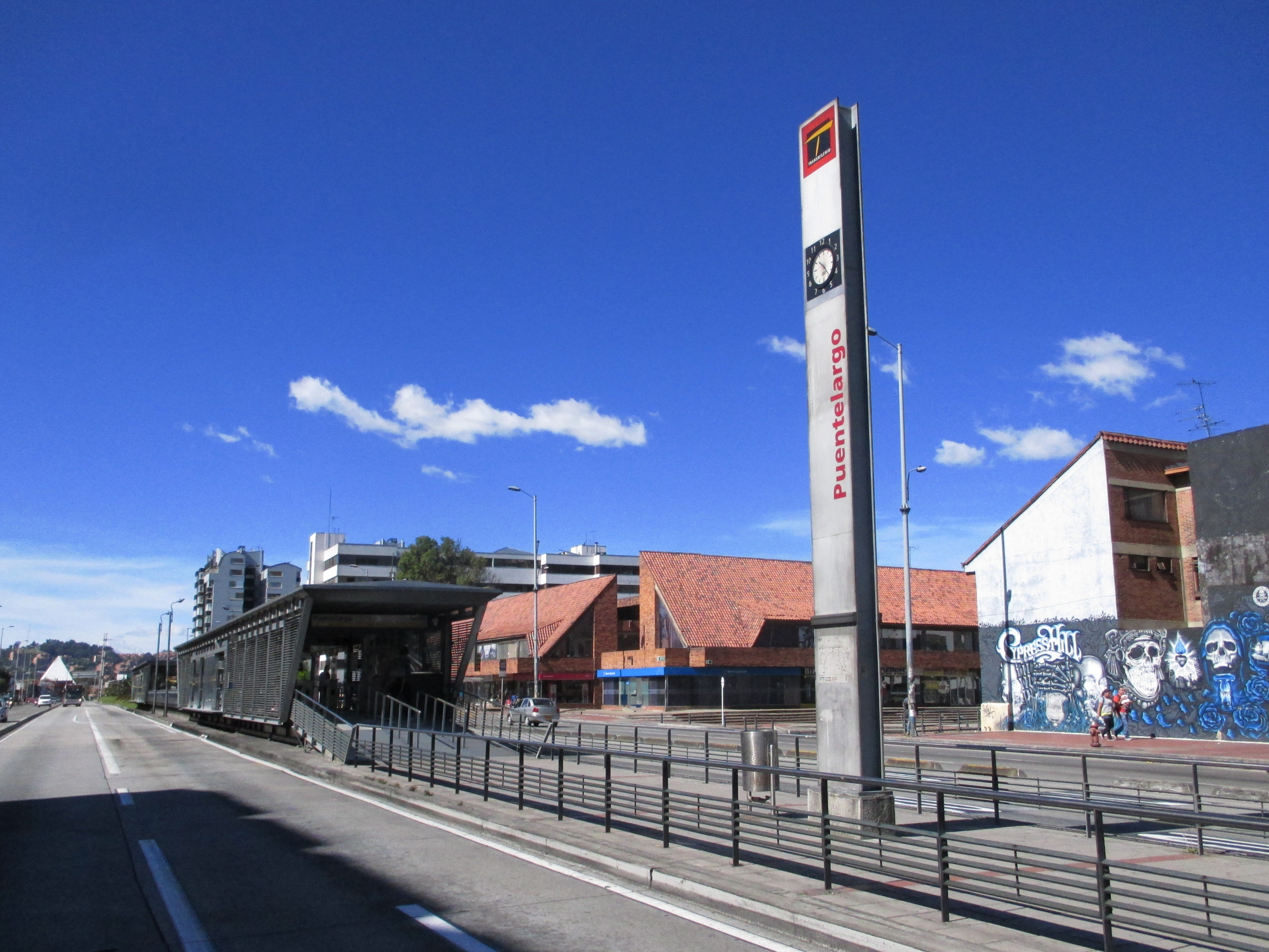
Puente Largo (TransMilenio)

== History ==
In 2006, phase two of the TransMilenio system was completed, including the Avenida Suba line, on which this station is located.

The station is named Puente Largo due to the neighborhood located to its east.

== Station Services ==
=== Main Line Service ===
Service as of April 29, 2006
| Type | Northern Routes | Southern Routes | Frequency |
|---|---|---|---|
| Local | 7 | 7 | Every three minutes |
| Express Monday through Saturday; All day | C15 C19 | H15 F19 | Every two minutes |
| Express Monday through Saturday; Morning rush | | J73 | Every two minutes |
| Express Monday through Saturday; Evening rush | C73 | | Every two minutes |
| Express Monday through Saturday; Morning and Evening rush | C29 | F29 | Every two minutes |
| Express Monday through Friday; Morning and Evening rush | C17 C30 | H17 G30 | Every two minutes |
| Express Saturday; All day | C17 | H17 | Every two minutes |
| Express Saturday of 5:00 a. m. to 3:00 p. m. | C30 | G30 | Every two minutes |
| Express Sundays and holidays | C91 C96 | F91 G96 | Every 3–4 minutes |

=== Feeder routes ===
This station does not have connections to feeder routes.

=== Inter-city service ===
This station does not have inter-city service.

== See also ==
- Bogotá
- TransMilenio
- List of TransMilenio Stations
