= Gratamira (TransMilenio) =

General information
- Location: Suba (Bogotá); Colombia

History
- Opened: April 29, 2006

Services
| Preceding station | TransMilenio | Following station |
|---|---|---|
| 21 Ángeles towards Portal de Suba | C | Suba Avenida Boyacá towards San Martín |

The simple station Gratamira is part of the TransMilenio mass-transit system of Bogotá, Colombia, which opened in the year 2000.

== Location ==
The station is located in northwestern Bogotá, specifically on Avenida Suba with Calle 132A.

It serves the Altos de Chozica, Ciudad Jardín Norte, and Escuela de Carabineros neighborhoods.

== History ==
In 2006, phase two of the TransMilenio system was completed, including the Avenida Suba line, on which this station is located.

The station is named Gratamira as it is located a few meters from the Gratamira housing complex.

== Station services ==
=== Main line service ===
Service as of April 29, 2006
| Type | Northern Routes | Southern Routes | Frequency |
|---|---|---|---|
| Local | 7 | 7 | Every three minutes |
| Express Monday through Saturday; All day | C19 | F19 | Every two minutes |

=== Feeder routes ===
This station does not have connections to feeder routes.

=== Inter-city service ===
This station does not have inter-city service.

== See also ==
- Bogotá
- TransMilenio
- List of TransMilenio Stations
