= Av. Suba Calle 116 (TransMilenio) =

Suba Calle 116

General information
- Location: Suba (Bogotá); Colombia

History
- Opened: April 29, 2006

Services
Preceding station	TransMilenio	Following station
Humedal Córdoba towards Portal de Suba	C	Puente Largo towards San Martín

Suba Calle 116, formerly named Shaio, is part of the TransMilenio mass-transit system of Bogotá, Colombia, which opened in the year 2000.

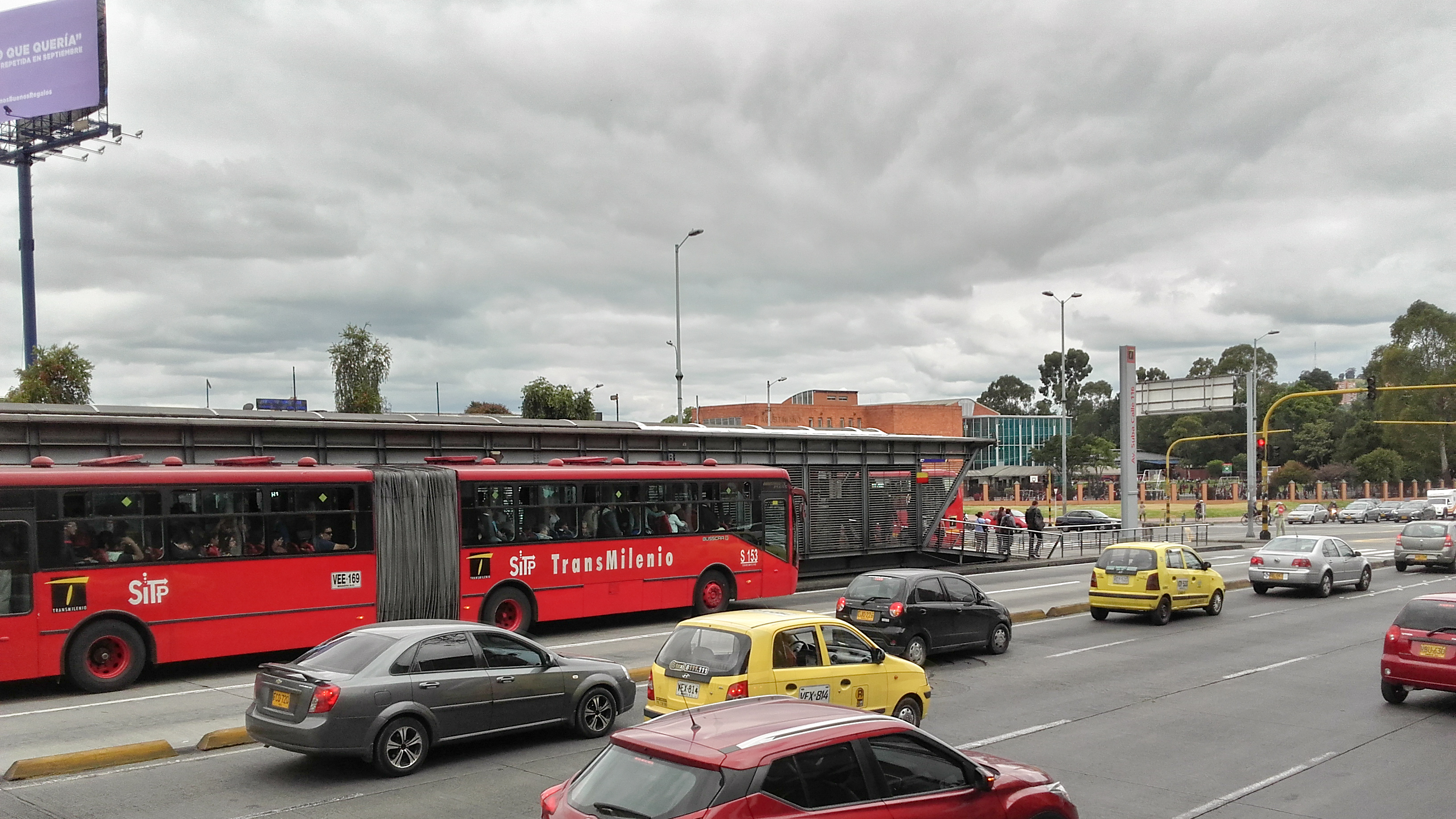
Av. Suba Calle 116 (TransMilenio)

== Location ==
The station is located in northwestern Bogotá, specifically between Calle 115 and Calle 116.

It serves the Ilarco, Pontevedra, and Santa Rosa neighborhoods.

== History ==
In 2006, phase two of the TransMilenio system was completed, including the Avenida Suba line, on which this station is located.

The station Suba Calle 116 is found in proximity to the Clínica Shaio, a cardiovascular health center, also the Colegio Agustiniano Norte, and the TELECOM (Colombia Telecomunicaciones S.A. ESP) offices and networking facilities.

== Station services ==
=== Main line service ===
Service as of April 29, 2006
Type	Northern Routes	Northwestern Routes	Southern Routes	Frequency
Local		7	7	Every three minutes
Express Monday through Saturday; Morning and Evening rush	B50	C29 C61	F29	Every two minutes
Express Monday through Friday; Morning and Evening rush		C30 C17	G30 H17	Every two minutes
Express Saturday; All day		C17	H17	Every two minutes
Express Saturday of 5:00 a. m. to 3:00 p. m.		C30	G30	Every two minutes
Express Sundays and holidays		C91 C96	F91 G96	Every 3–4 minutes

=== Feeder routes ===
This station does not have connections to feeder routes.

=== Inter-city service ===
This station does not have inter-city service.

== See also ==
- Bogotá
- TransMilenio
- List of TransMilenio Stations
