= Suba Calle 95 (TransMilenio) =

General information
- Location: Suba (Bogotá); Colombia

History
- Opened: April 29, 2006

Services
Preceding station	TransMilenio	Following station
Suba Calle 100 towards Portal de Suba	C	Rionegro towards San Martín

The simple station Suba Calle 95 is part of the TransMilenio mass-transit system of Bogotá, Colombia, which opened in the year 2000.

== Location ==
The station is located in northwestern Bogotá, specifically on Avenida Suba with Calle 95.

It serves the Andes, La Castellana, and Rionegro neighborhoods.

== History ==
In 2006, phase two of the TransMilenio system was completed, including the Avenida Suba line, on which this station is located.

The station is named Suba Calle 95 due to its location at the intersection of Avenida Suba with Calle 95.

== Station services ==
=== Main line service ===
Service as of April 29, 2006
Type	Northern Routes	Southern Routes	Frequency
Local	7	7	Every 3 minutes
Express Monday through Saturday; All day	C19	F19	
Express Monday through Saturday; Mixed service, rush and non-rush	C30	G30	Every two minutes
Express Saturday; 5:00 a.m through 3:00 p.m	C30	G30	Every two minutes
Express Sundays and holidays	C91	F91	Every 3–4 minutes

=== Feeder routes ===
This station does not have connections to feeder routes.

=== Inter-city service ===
This station does not have inter-city service.

== See also ==
- Bogotá
- TransMilenio
- List of TransMilenio Stations
