= Niza Calle 127 (TransMilenio) =

General information
- Location: Suba (Bogotá); Colombia

History
- Opened: April 29, 2006

Services
Preceding station	TransMilenio	Following station
Suba Avenida Boyacá towards Portal de Suba	C	Humedal Córdoba towards San Martín

The simple station Niza Calle 127 is part of the TransMilenio mass-transit system of Bogotá, Colombia, which opened in the year 2000.

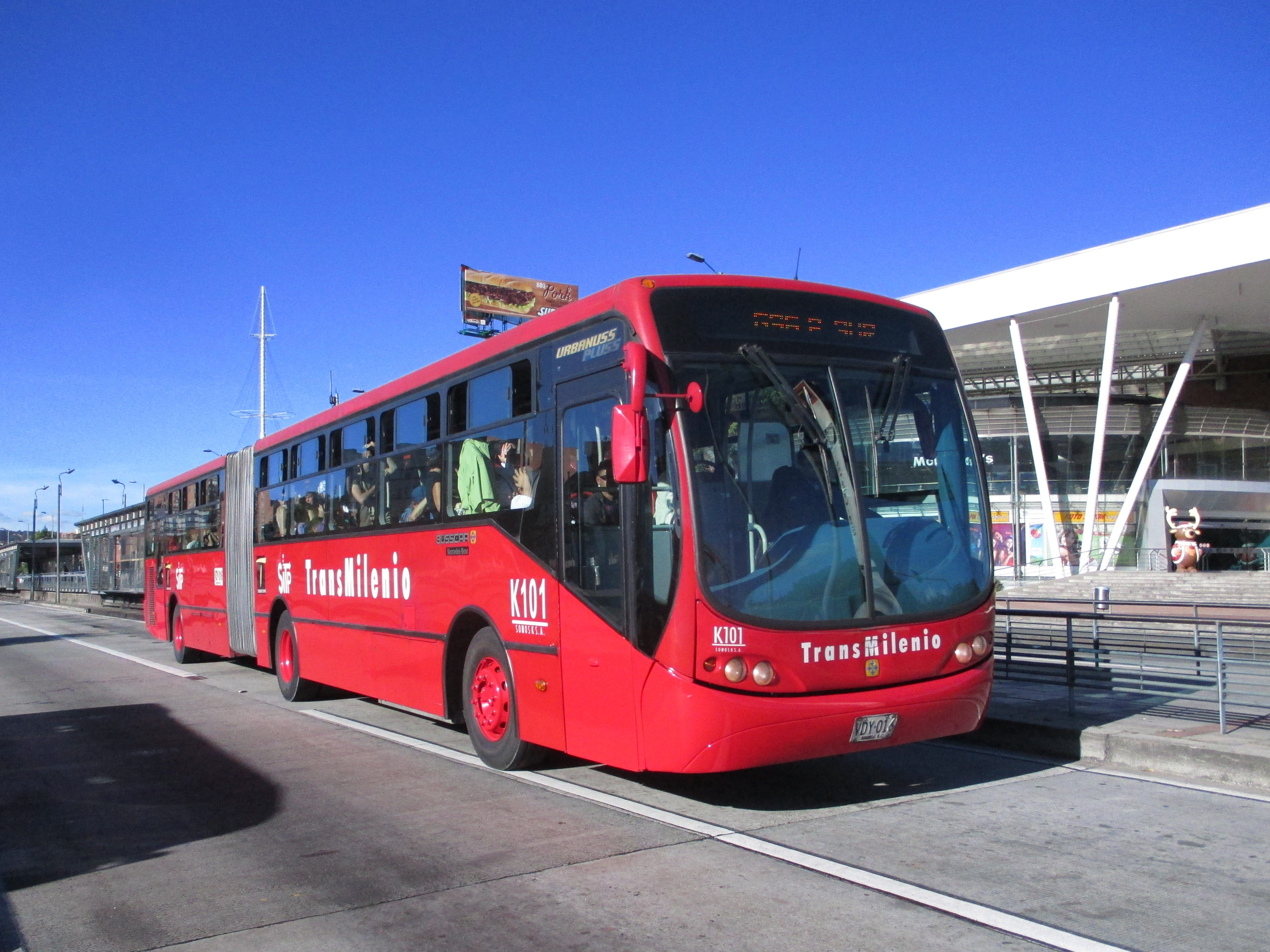
Niza Calle 127 (TransMilenio)

== Location ==
The station is located in northwestern Bogotá, specifically on Avenida Suba with Calles 127 and 127D.

It serves the Niza, Calatrava, and Las Villas neighborhoods.

== History ==
In 2006, phase two of the TransMilenio system was completed, including the Avenida Suba line, on which this station is located.

The station is named Niza-Cll 127 for its proximity to the Niza neighborhood and the arterial road Avenida Calle 127.

Nearby are the Niza and Bulevar Niza shopping centers.

== Station services ==
=== Main line service ===
Service as of April 29, 2006
Type	Northern Routes	Southern Routes	Frequency
Local	7	7	Every three minutes
Express Monday through Saturday; All day	C15	H15	Every two minutes
Express Monday through Saturday; Morning rush		J73	Every two minutes
Express Monday through Saturday; Evening rush	C73		Every two minutes
Express Sundays and holidays	C96	G96	Every 3–4 minutes

=== Feeder routes ===
This station does not have connections to feeder routes.

=== Inter-city service ===
This station does not have inter-city service.

== See also ==
- Bogotá
- TransMilenio
- List of TransMilenio Stations
