= Suba Transversal 91 (TransMilenio) =

Suba-Transversal 91

General information
- Location: Suba (Bogotá); Colombia

History
- Opened: April 29, 2006

Services
Preceding station	TransMilenio	Following station
La Campiña towards Portal de Suba	C	21 Ángeles towards San Martín

The simple station Suba-Transversal 91, or Suba - Tv.91 by its abbreviation, is part of the TransMilenio mass-transit system of Bogotá, Colombia, which opened in the year 2000.

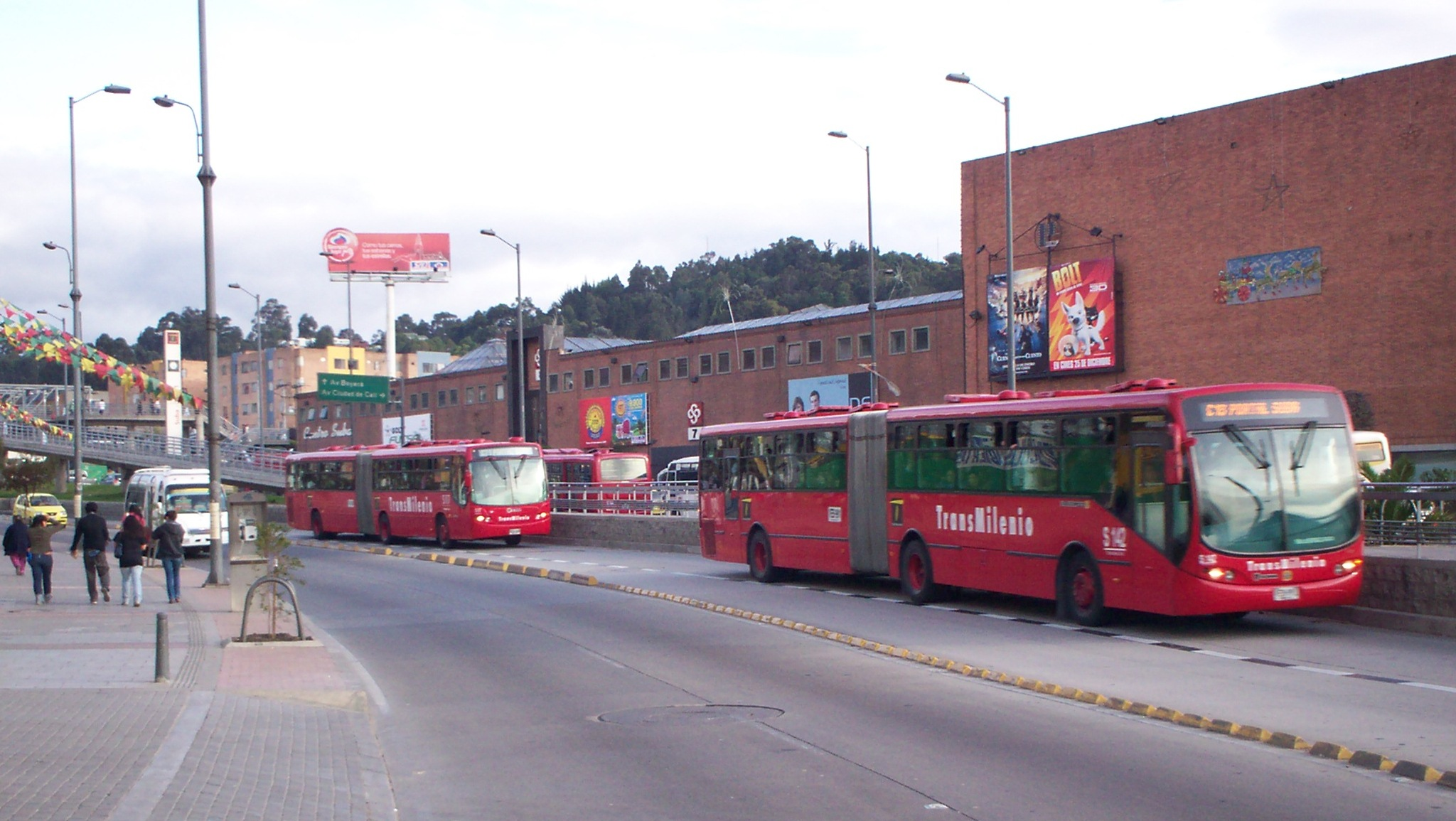
Suba Transversal 91 (TransMilenio)

== Location ==
The station is located in northwestern Bogotá, specifically on Avenida Suba between Carreras 91 and 94C.

It is the nearest station to the center of the old village of Suba, which is now incorporated into the city of Bogotá.

It serves the Provenza, Suba-Centro, Java, and La Trinidad neighborhoods.

== History ==
In 2006, phase two of the TransMilenio system was completed, including the Avenida Suba line, on which this station is located.

The station is named Suba - Tv.91 due to its proximity to that intersection.

== Station services ==
=== Main line service ===
Service as of April 29, 2006
Type	Northern Routes	Northwestern Routes	Southern Routes	Frequency
Local		7	7	Every three minutes
Express Monday through Saturday; All day		C19	F19	Every two minutes
Express Monday through Saturday; Morning rush	B56		J73	Every two minutes
Express Monday through Saturday; Evening rush		C73		Every two minutes
Express Monday through Saturday; Morning and Evening rush	B50	C29 C61	F29	Every two minutes
Express Monday through Friday; Morning and Evening rush	C30		G30	Every two minutes
Express Saturday of 5:00 a. m. to 3:00 p. m.	C30		G30	Every two minutes
Express Sundays and holidays		C91 C96	F91 G96	Every 3–4 minutes

=== Feeder routes ===
This station does not have connections to feeder routes.

=== Inter-city service ===
This station does not have inter-city service.

== See also ==
- Bogotá
- TransMilenio
- List of TransMilenio Stations
