= Suba Calle 100 (TransMilenio) =

General information
- Location: Suba (Bogotá); Colombia

History
- Opened: April 29, 2006

Services
Preceding station	TransMilenio	Following station
Puente Largo towards Portal de Suba	C	Suba Calle 95 towards San Martín

The simple station Suba Calle 100 is part of the TransMilenio mass-transit system of Bogotá, Colombia, which opened in the year 2000.

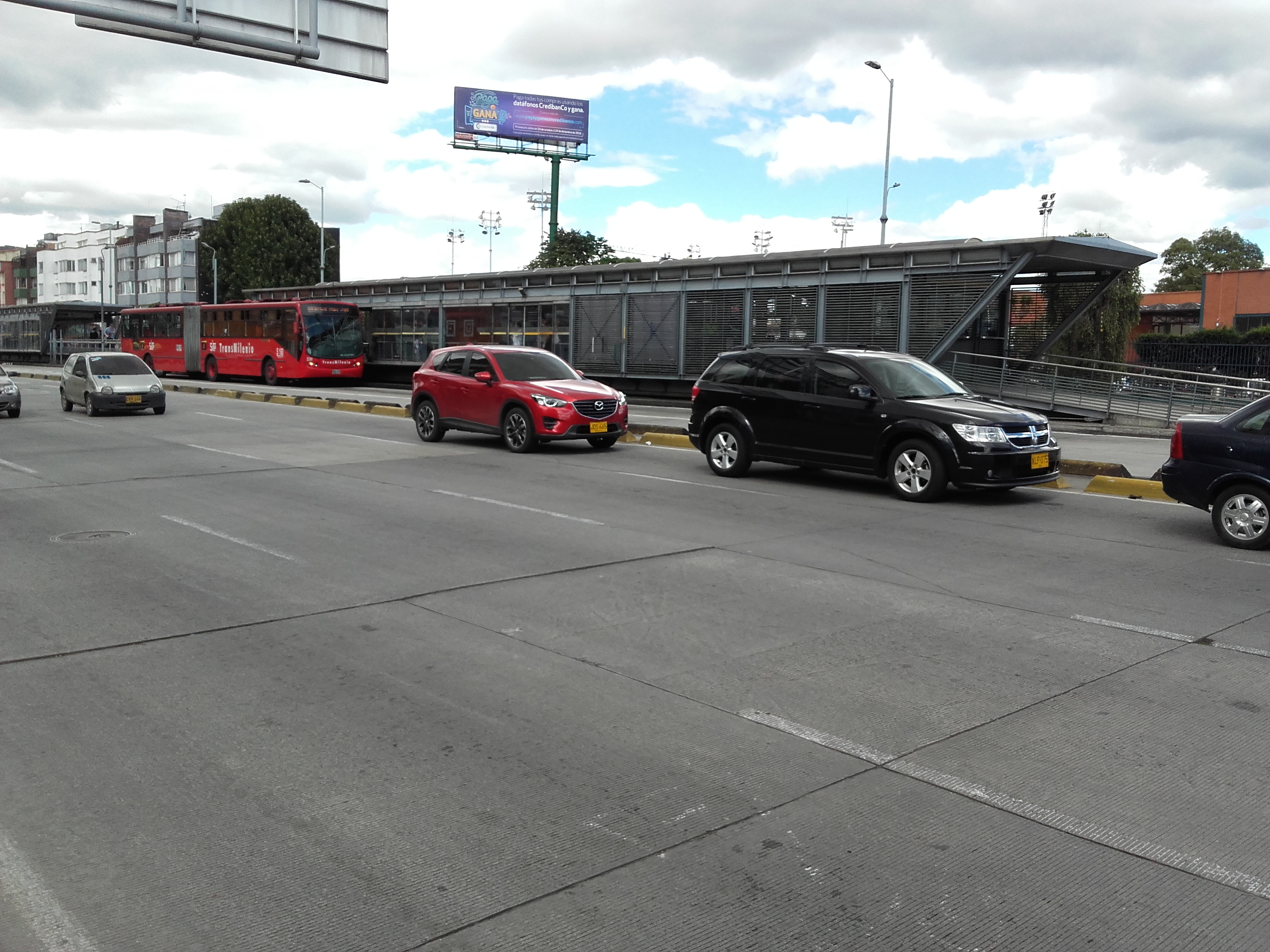
Suba Calle 100 (TransMilenio)

== Location ==
The station is located in northwestern Bogotá, specifically on Avenida Suba with Calle 100.

It serves the Andes, Andes Norte, Ilarco, and Pasadena neighborhoods.

Nearby is the Iserra 100 shopping center.

== History ==
In 2006, phase two of the TransMilenio system was completed, including the Avenida Suba line, on which this station is located.

The station is named Suba Calle 100 due to its location on the north side of the intersection of Avenida Suba with Avenida Calle 100(100th. Street) (or Avenida España).

== Station services ==
=== Main line service ===
Service as of April 29, 2006
Type	Northern Routes	Southern Routes	Frequency
Local	7	7	Every three minutes
Express Monday through Saturday; All day	C19	F19	Every two minutes
Express Monday through Saturday; Morning and Evening rush	C29	F29	Every two minutes
Express Sundays and holidays	C96	G96	Every 3–4 minutes

=== Dual services ===
Services rendered since April 15, 2014
Kind	Routes to the North	Routes to the East
Dual Monday to Sunday all day	C84	M84

=== Feeder routes ===
This station does not have connections to feeder routes.

=== Inter-city service ===
This station does not have inter-city service.

== See also ==
- Bogotá
- TransMilenio
- List of TransMilenio Stations
