= Rionegro (TransMilenio) =

General information
- Location: Suba (Bogotá); Colombia

History
- Opened: April 29, 2006

Services
Preceding station	TransMilenio	Following station
Suba Calle 95 towards Portal de Suba	C	San Martín Terminus

The simple station Rionegro is part of the TransMilenio mass-transit system of Bogotá, Colombia, which opened in the year 2000.

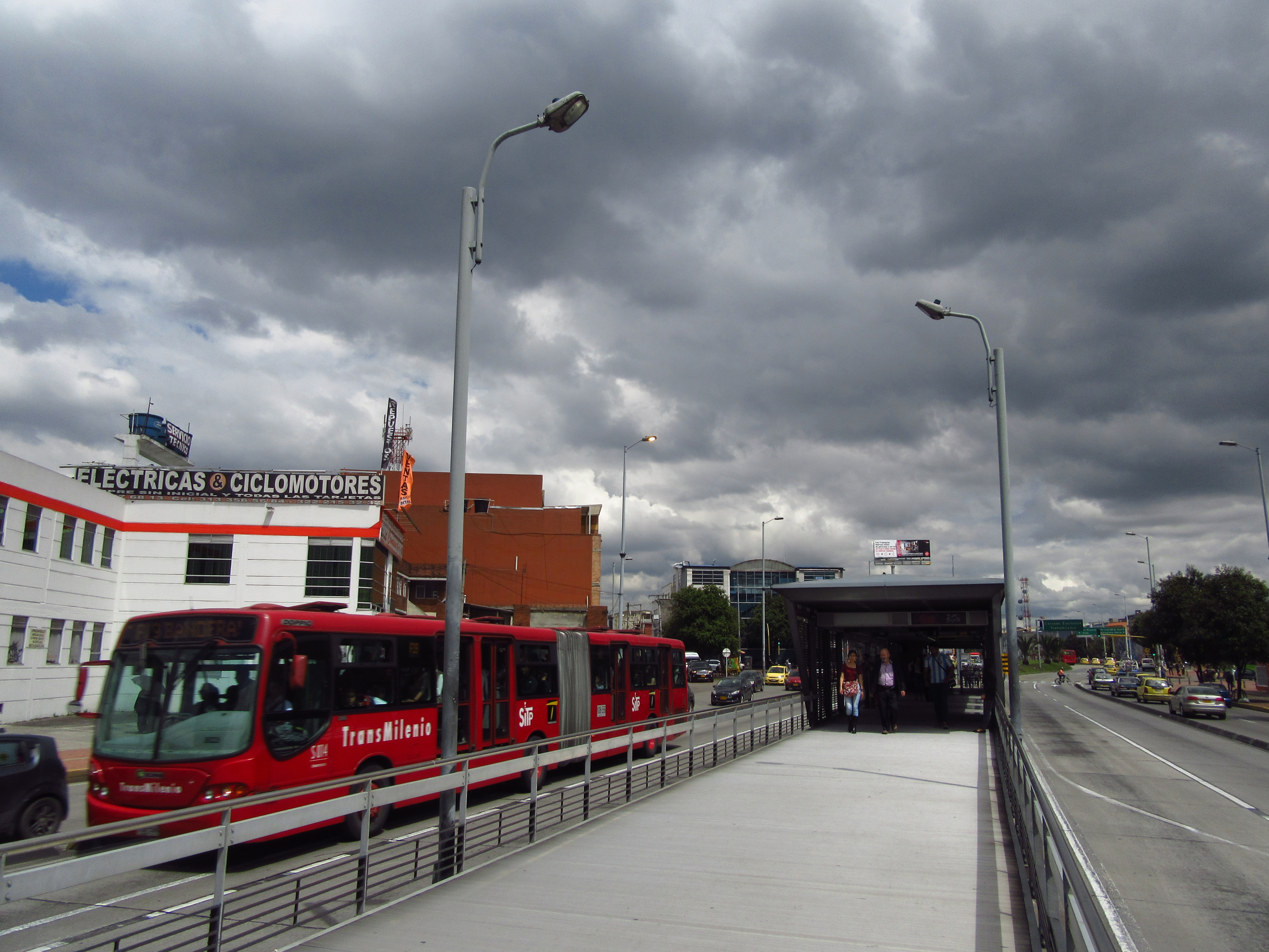
Rionegro (TransMilenio)

== Location ==
The station is located in northwestern Bogotá, specifically on Avenida Suba with Calle 91.

It serves the Rionegro and La Castellana neighborhoods.

== History ==
In 2006, phase two of the TransMilenio system was completed, including the Avenida Suba line, on which this station is located.

The station is named Rionegro, as it is located two blocks from the location where Avenida Suba crosses the Rionegro canal, which runs west of the Juan Amarillo River. The canal runs from the east, from the El Virrey channel through El Virrey park.

The neighborhood located to the west of the station takes the same name; Rionegro.

== Station services ==
=== Main line service ===
Services rendered since April 29, 2006
Kind	Routes to the North	Routes to Northwestern	South Routes
Local		7	7
Express Monday through Saturday; All day	C15		H15
Express Monday to Saturday morning and afternoon peak hours	B50	C61	

=== Feeder routes ===
This station does not have connections to feeder routes.

=== Inter-city service ===
This station does not have inter-city service.

== See also ==
- Bogotá
- TransMilenio
- List of TransMilenio Stations
