= La Campiña (TransMilenio) =

Mass transit station of Bogotá, Colombia

Coordinates: 4°44′34″N 74°05′28″W

General information
- Location: Suba (Bogotá); Colombia

History
- Opened: April 29, 2006

Services
Preceding station	TransMilenio	Following station
Portal de Suba Terminus	C	Suba Transversal 91 towards San Martín
Location

The simple station La Campiña is part of the TransMilenio mass-transit system of Bogotá, Colombia, which opened in the year 2000.

== Location ==
The station is located in northwestern Bogotá, specifically on Avenida Suba between Carreras 98B and 101.

It serves the La Campiña, Java, and El Poa neighborhoods.

== History ==
In 2006, phase two of the TransMilenio system was completed, including the Avenida Suba line, on which this station is located.

The station is named La Campiña for the neighborhood located across Avenida Suba to the north.

== Station services ==
=== Main line service ===
Service as of April 29, 2006
Type	Northern Routes	Northwestern Routes	Southern Routes	Frequency
Local		7	7	Every three minutes
Express Monday through Saturday; All day		C19	F19	Every two minutes
Express Monday through Saturday; Morning rush			J73	Every two minutes
Express Monday through Saturday; Evening rush		C73		Every two minutes
Express Monday through Saturday; Morning and Evening rush	B50	C29 C61	F29	Every two minutes
Express Monday through Friday; Morning and Evening rush		C17 C30	H17 G30	Every two minutes
Express Saturday; All day		C17	H17	Every two minutes
Express Saturday of 5:00 a. m. to 3:00 p. m.		C30	G30	Every two minutes
Express Sundays and holidays		C91	F91	Every 3–4 minutes

=== Feeder routes ===
This station does not have connections to feeder routes.

=== Inter-city service ===
This station does not have inter-city service.

== See also ==
- Bogotá
- TransMilenio
- List of TransMilenio Stations
