= Suba, Bogotá =

Suba
- Locality of Bogotá
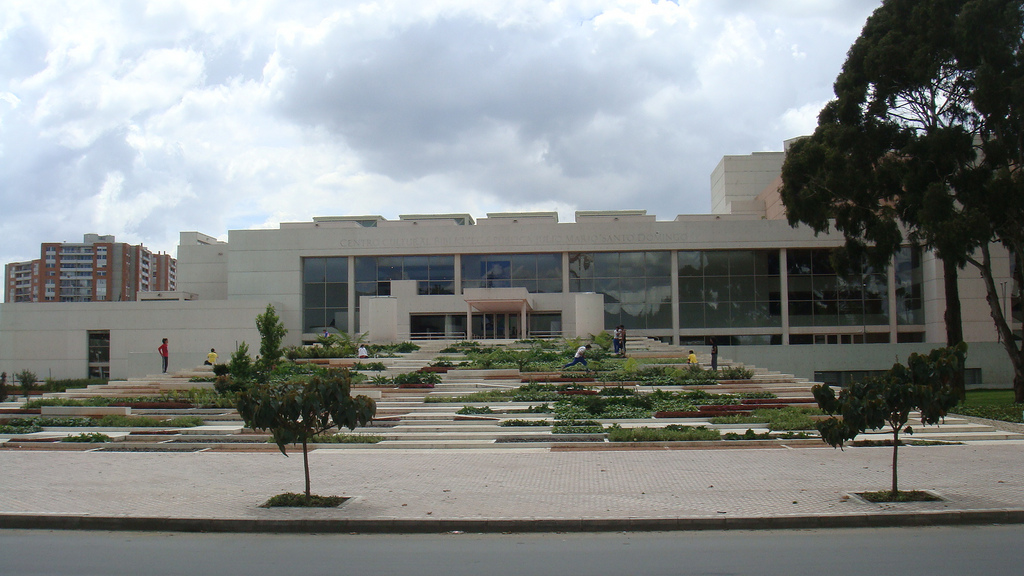
- Julio Mario Santo Domingo Public Library

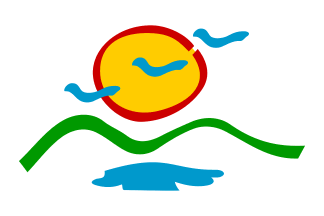
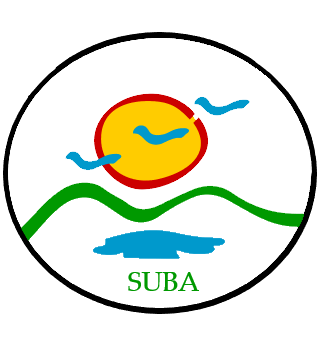
- Flag Seal

- Location of the locality in the city of Bogotá

- Location of the locality in the Capital District of Bogotá
- Coordinates: 4.741°N 74.084°W
- Country: Colombia
- City: Bogotá D.C.
- Neighbourhoods: List: Suba; Prado; Ciudad Jardín Norte; Mazurén; Niza

Area
  - Total: 100.56 km^{2} (38.83 sq mi)
- Elevation: 2,700 m (8,900 ft)

Population (2015)
  - Total: 1,161,500
  - Density: 11,550/km^{2} (29,915/sq mi)
- Time zone: UTC-5 (Colombia Standard Time)
- Website: Official website

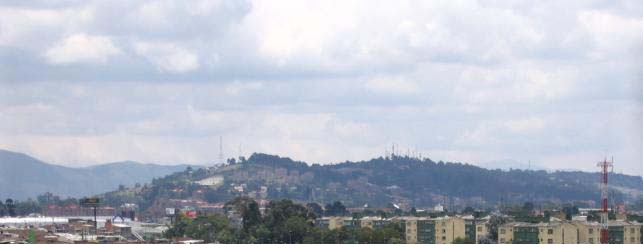
View of the Suba Hills, Bogotá

Suba is the 11th locality of Bogotá, capital of Colombia. It is located in the northwest of the city, bordering to the north the municipality of Chía in Cundinamarca, to the west the municipality of Cota, to the east the locality Usaquén and to the south the localities Engativá and Barrios Unidos. This district is inhabited by residents of all social classes.

== Etymology ==
Suba is either derived from the Muysccubun contraction Suba, meaning "Flower of the Sun" (uba = "fruit" or "flower", sua = "Sun", minus its last vowel, making it a possessive) or from the words sua (Sun) and sie (water).

== Geography ==
Suba has certain green areas, mostly concentrated in the west of the locality, on the Suba and the La Conejera Hills, as well as the plains where urbanisation has developed. Suba has become a residential area with small industrial and commercial zones located in the south of the locality. The Suba Hills separate the locality into two parts; the eastern side being more integrated with the urban area of Bogotá.

The locality borders the Bogotá River to the northwest and borders at Calle 240 the municipality of Chia. To the south, the Juan Amarillo River and Calle 100 form the boundary with the localities of Engativá and Barrios Unidos. The eastern limit is the Autopista Norte with the locality of Usaquén and to the west, the Bogotá River forms the boundary with the municipality of Cota.

Besides the Bogota and Juan Amarillo rivers the locality of Suba is covered by other streams and wetlands like the Torca and Guaymaral wetlands, La Conejera, Córdoba and the Tibabuyes wetland.

=== Transport ===
The Avenida Suba is the main road of Suba and the one that connects eastern with western Suba. Other major streets include the Avenida Ciudad de Cali to the west and the Autopista Norte to the east. The Avenida Boyacá crossed Suba from north to south.

Since April 29, 2006, the mass-transit system TransMilenio covers the area along the Autopista Norte with its "B Line"; Portal del Norte, Toberín, Calle 161, Mazurén, Calle 146, Calle 142, Alcalá, Prado, Calle 127, Pepe Sierra, Calle 106 and Avenida Suba with its "C Line"; Portal de Suba, La Campiña, Suba-Transversal 91, 21 Ángeles, Gratamira, Suba-Boyacá Avenue, Niza Calle 127, Humedal Córdoba, Av. Suba Calle 116, Puente Largo, Suba Calle 100, Suba Calle 95, Rionegro and San Martín.

Other avenues like Avenida Boyacá, Avenida Ciudad de Cali, Calle 134 and Calle 170 are serviced by regular bus companies. There is also an inter-municipal highway that connects the locality of Suba with the municipality of Cota in the department of Cundinamarca.

=== Economy ===
The main economic activity of Suba relies on the cultivation of export quality flowers, services and commerce, specially of large shopping centers like Bulevar Niza, Centro Suba, Parque la Colina, Plaza Imperial and Centro Comercial Santa Fé.

=== Territorial subdivision ===
Suba hosts a Regional Forest Reserve Zone, called La Conejera, located in the northwestern part of the locality and 12 Units of Zone Planning (Unidades de Planeamiento Zonal, UPZ) which are: La Academia, Guaymaral, San José de Bavaria, Britalia, El Prado, La Alhambra, La Floresta, Niza, Casablanca, Suba centro, El Rincón and Tibabuyes.

== History ==
During the Last Glacial Maximum in the Late Pleistocene, the climate in the region of Suba gave rise to alternations of páramo and Andean forests. Since approximately 12,000 years BP, groups of hunter-gatherers inhabited the area. Around 3500 BC, the people began to domesticate animals, cultivate crops and create arts and crafts. By 500 BC, maize and potatoes were the predominant products cultivated and by the year 800 the Muisca inhabited the area. After the Spanish conquest of the Muisca, in 1538, the Muisca were preserved in a Resguardo, located in the area of Suba and to the north in Chía and Cota. In 1550, Antonio Días Cardoso and Hernán Camilo Monsilva founded the village of Suba.

On June 22, 1850, the Resguardo of the Muisca in Suba was closed and the indigenous people forced away from the urban areas. This process continued until the year 1877.

On November 16, 1875, Suba was declared a territory free of indigenous people and became a satellite municipality of Bogotá. It became a municipality by decree during the Sovereign State of Cundinamarca. The rural area then was divided into landlords and peasants.

In 1954 the municipality was formally annexed to the "Special District of Bogotá" during the reign of Gustavo Rojas Pinilla while still keeping its municipality status. In 1977, a minor city hall was constructed and in 1991 Suba was elevated to a locality of the renamed Capital District.

In 1990, the indigenous peoples of Suba and their towns were legally recognized by the government and ratified in the Colombian Constitution of 1991. In 1992 and 2001, the Cabildo Muisca of Suba and the Cabildo Muisca of Bosa respectively were legally recognized in an official ceremony with the participation of the then Mayor of Bogotá Antanas Mockus as stipulated in the Law 89 of 1890 and after more than a century without legal existence, it was also ratified in 2005.

== Indigenous population ==
According to the numbers provided by the respective Cabildos, the Muisca population of Suba is estimated to 5186 people. The indigenous last names with their origin in Suba are conserved as Niviayo, Bulla, Cabiativa, Caita, Nivia, Chisaba, Muzuzu, Neuque, Yopasá, and Quinche.

== Sites of interest ==
- Suba and La Conejera Hills
- Wetlands of Córdoba, Juan Amarillo and La Conejera
- Headquarters of the indigenous peoples Cabildo
- Central Park of Suba
- Viewpoint of Los Nevados
- Julio Mario Santo Domingo Public Library
- Laura Weinstein LGBTI Centre

== Neighbourhoods ==
=== Southeastern neighborhoods ===
The southeastern zone includes the neighborhoods of Niza, Las Floresta and Prado. The neighborhoods of Andes, La Floresta, Puente Largo, Pontevedra, Santa Rosa, San Nicolás, Morato, La Alhambra, Malibú, Batán, Niza, Córdoba, Las Villas, Calatrava, Colina Campestre and Prado Veraniego. This area is mostly inhabited by upper middle and upper class residents.

=== Northeastern neighborhoods ===
The northeastern zone includes the neighborhoods of San José de Bavaria, Mazurén, Britalia, Casablanca, Granada Norte, Villa del Prado, Nueva Zelandia, Mirandela. This area is mostly inhabited by middle class residents.

=== Southwestern neighborhoods ===
The southwestern neighborhoods include the sector of main Suba; The neighborhoods of Suba, La Campiña, Pinares, Tuna baja, La pradera, Nuevo Suba, Aures 1 and Aures 2, Alcaparros, Cataluña, Costa Azul, Lagos de Suba, Corinto, El Laguito Villa Maria, La Chucua Norte, El Rosal de Suba, El Rincón, El Rubí, Bilbao, Fontanar del Río, La Gaitana, Tibabuyes, Lisboa, Berlín and Villa Cindy, Sabana de Tibabuyes. This area is mostly inhabited by lower and working class residents.

=== Northwestern neighbourhoods ===
The northwest includes the sector of Guaymaral, Arrayanes and Corpas. This area is mostly rural and contains exclusive golf clubs, elite private schools, upper class mansions and a private airport.
