= List of TransMilenio stations =

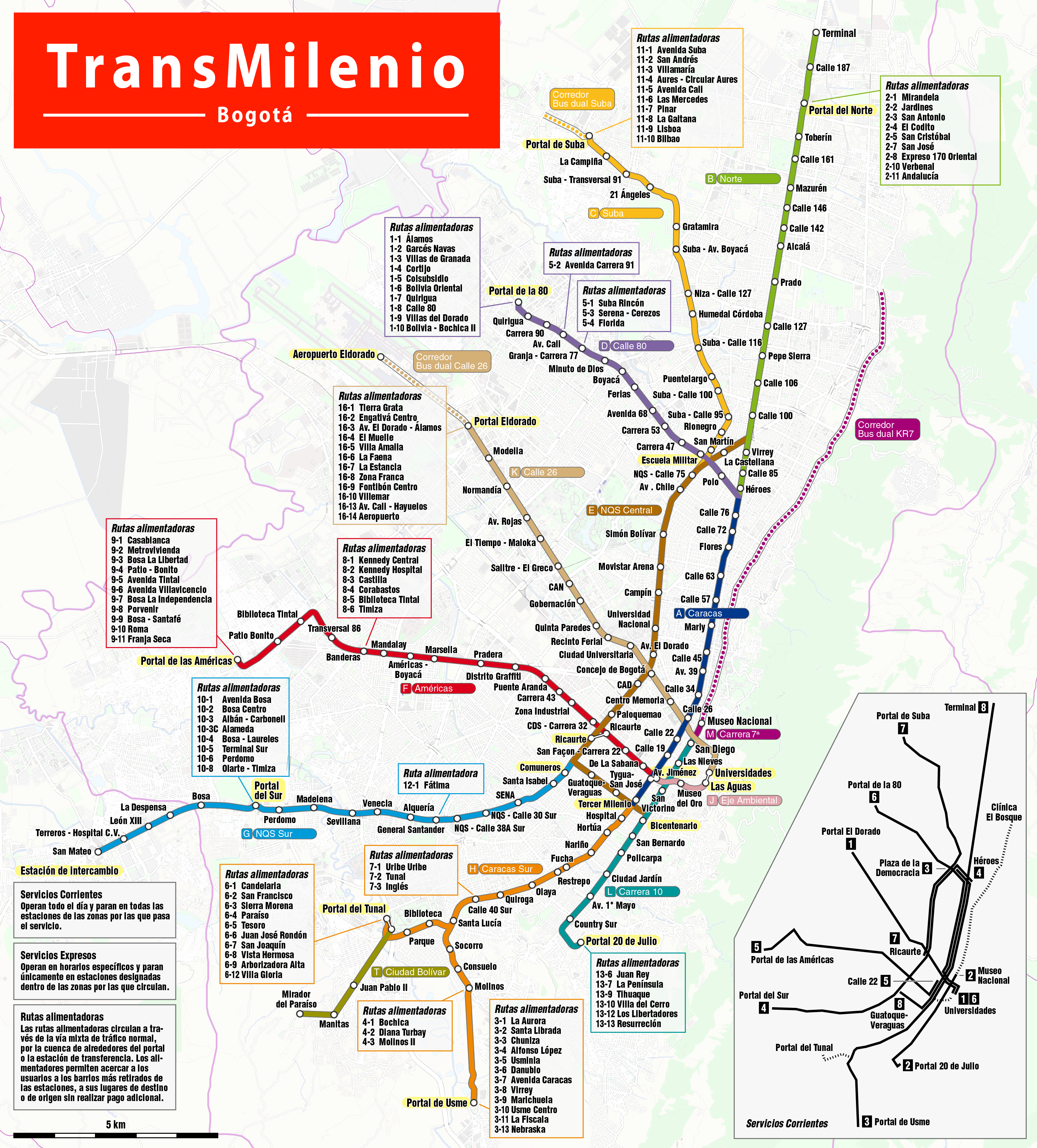
System map with stations

This is a complete list of 147 stations of the TransMilenio (143 at Bogotá and 4 at Soacha), Colombia

The stations are distributed according to the zones implemented April 29, 2006.

== Caracas ==
(From south to north)

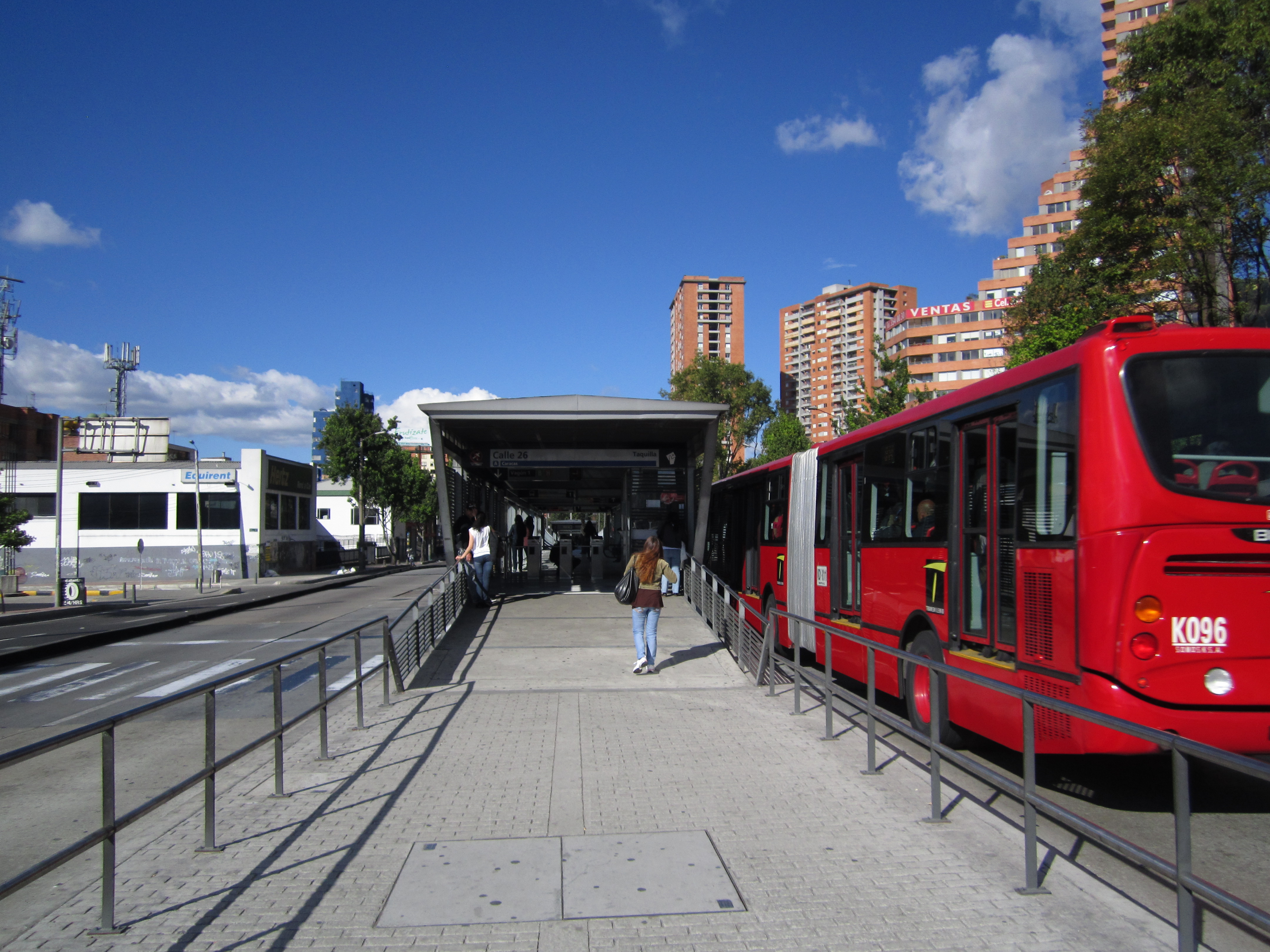
Calle 26 station

- A Tercer Milenio
- A Avenida Jiménez
- A Calle 19
- A Calle 22
- A Calle 26
- A Calle 34
- A Avenida 39
- A Calle 45 - American School Way
- A Marly
- A Calle 57
- A Calle 63
- A Flores - Areandina
- A Calle 72
- A Calle 76 - San Felipe

== Autonorte ==
(From north to south)

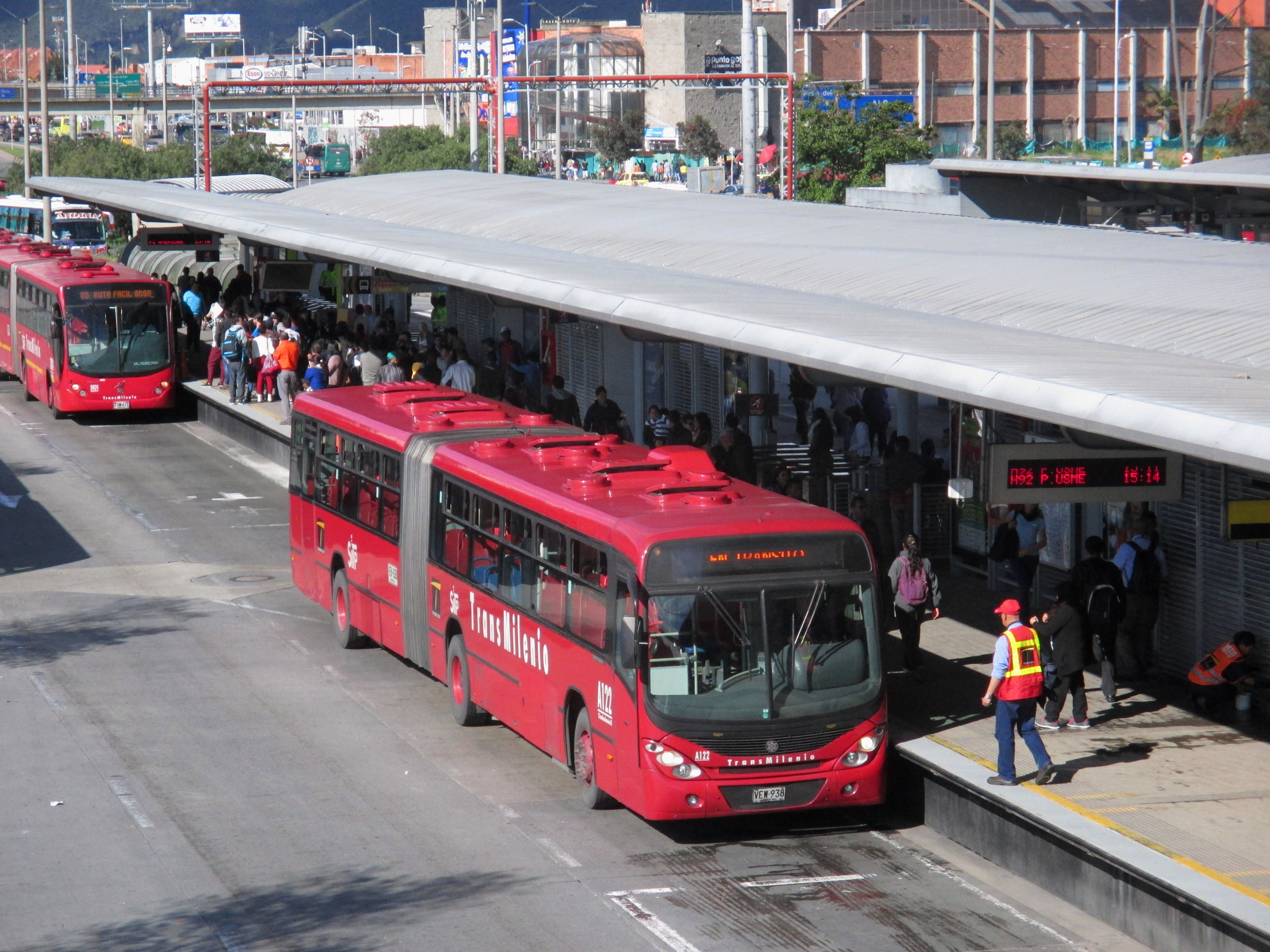
Portal del Norte station

- B Terminal
- B Calle 187
- B Portal del Norte
- B Toberín - Foundever
- B Calle 161
- B Mazurén
- B Calle 146
- B Calle 142
- B Alcalá
- B Prado
- B Calle 127
- B Pepe Sierra
- B Calle 106
- B Calle 100 - Marketmedios
- B Virrey
- B Calle 85
- B Héroes - Gel'hada

== Suba ==
(From west to east)

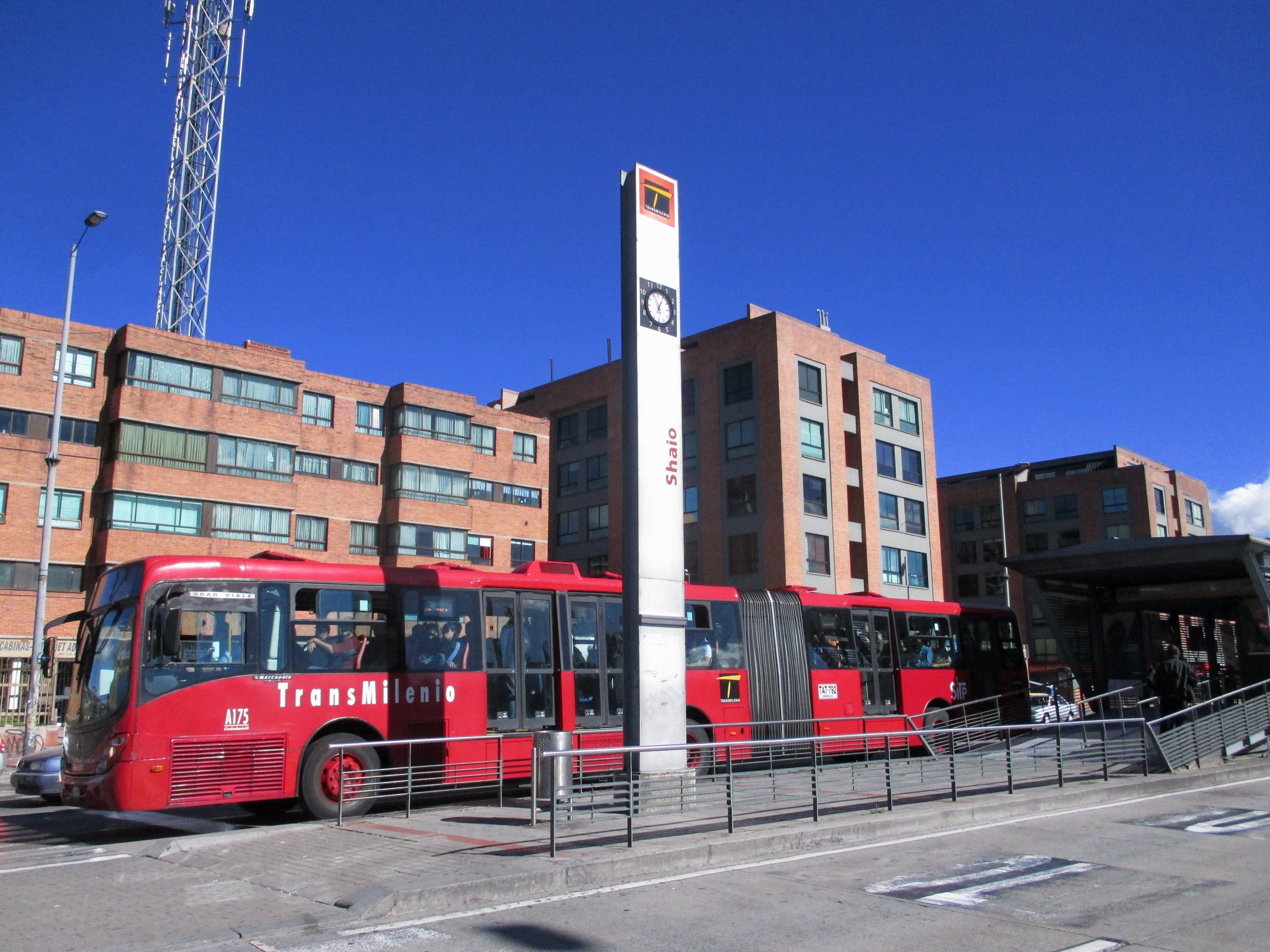
Av. Suba - Calle 116 station

- C Portal de Suba
- C La Campiña
- C Av. Suba - Tv. 91
- C 21 Ángeles
- C Gratamira
- C Av. Suba - Av. Boyacá
- C Niza - Calle 127
- C Humedal Córdoba
- C Av. Suba - Calle 116
- C Puente Largo
- C Av. Suba - Calle 100
- C Av. Suba - Calle 95
- C Rionegro
- C San Martín

== Calle 80 ==
(From west to east)

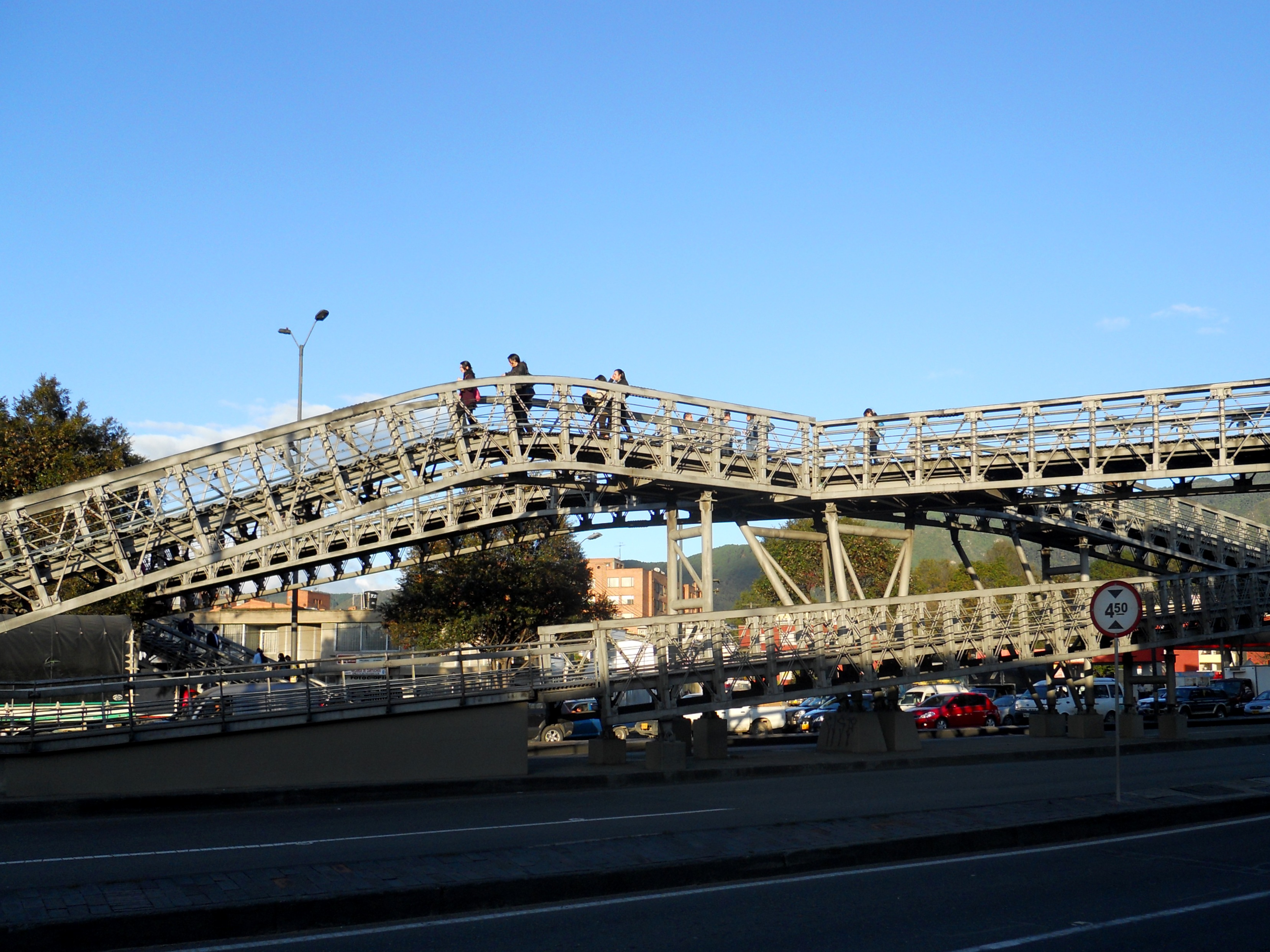
Polo station

- D Portal de la 80
- D Quirigua
- D Carrera 90
- D Avenida Cali
- D Granja -Carrera 77
- D Minuto de Dios
- D Boyacá
- D Ferias
- D Avenida 68
- D Carrera 53
- D Carrera 47
- D Escuela Militar
- D Polo

== NQS Central ==
(From west to east)

- E Tygua - San José
- E Guatoque - Veraguas

(From south to north)

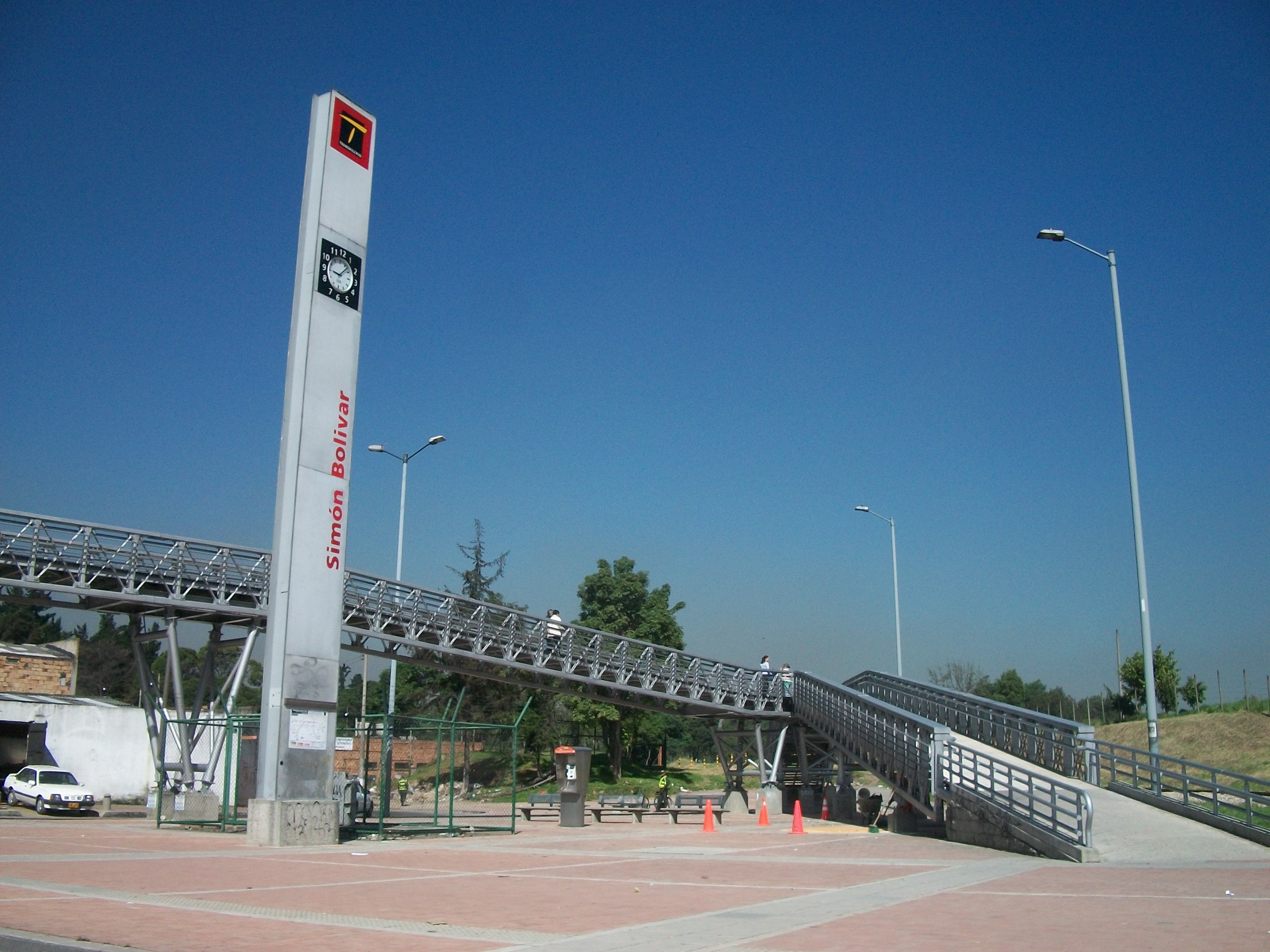
7 de Agosto station

- E Ricaurte
- E Paloquemao
- E CAD
- E Avenida El Dorado
- E Universidad Nacional de Colombia
- E El Campín - Universidad Antonio Nariño
- E Movistar Arena
- E 7 de Agosto
- E Avenida Chile
- E Calle 75 - Zona M
- E La Castellana

== Las Américas ==
(From west to east)

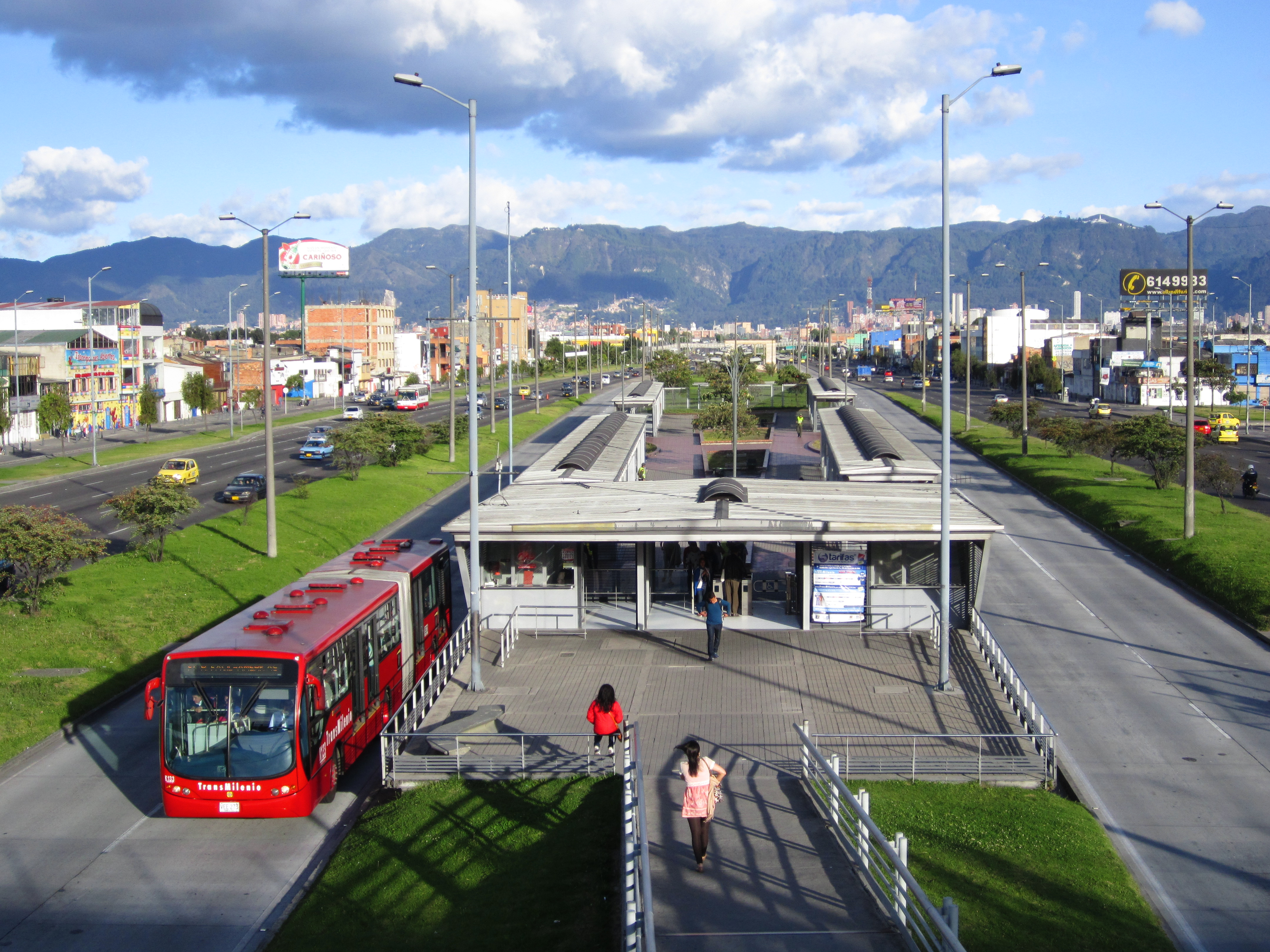
Américas – Avenida Boyacá station

- F Portal de Las Américas
- F Patio Bonito
- F Biblioteca Tintal
- F Transversal 86
- F Banderas
- F Mandalay
- F Américas–Avenida Boyacá
- F Marsella
- F Pradera
- F Distrito Grafiti
- F Puente Aranda
- F Carrera 43 - COMAPAN
- F Zona Industrial
- F CDS - Carrera 32
- F Ricaurte
- F San Façon - Carrera 22
- F De La Sabana

== NQS Sur ==
(From south to north)

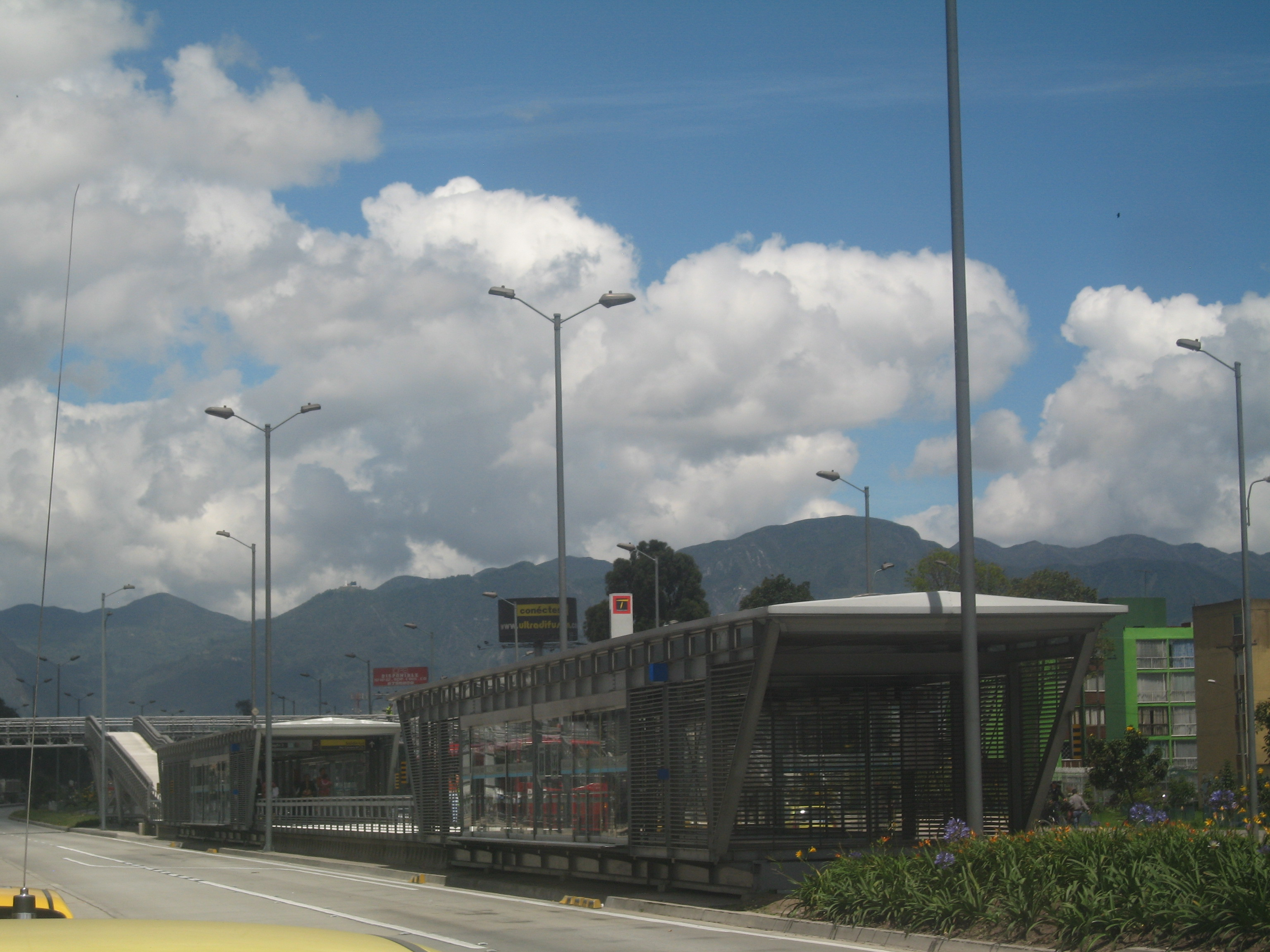
Centro Comercial Paseo Villa del Río - Madelena station

- G San Mateo - Centro Comercial Unisur
- G Terreros - Hospital C. V.
- G León XIII
- G La Despensa
- G Bosa
- G Portal Sur - JFK Cooperativa Financiera
- G Perdomo
- G Centro Comercial Paseo Villa del Río - Madelena
- G Sevillana
- G Venecia
- G Alquería
- G General Santander
- G NQS Calle 38A Sur
- G NQS Calle 30 Sur
- G SENA
- G Santa Isabel
- G Comuneros

== Caracas Sur ==
(From south to north)

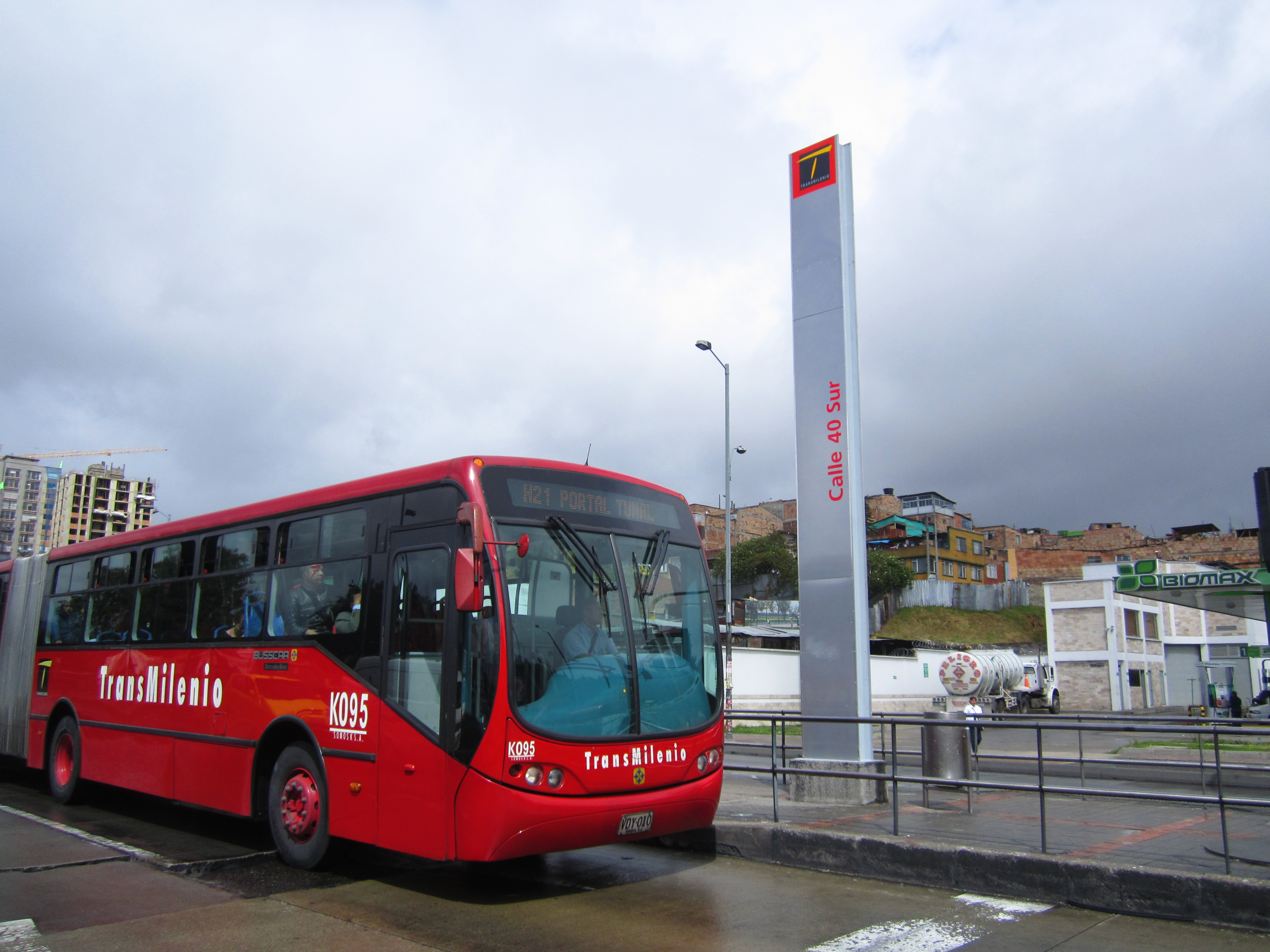
Calle 40 Sur intermediate station

- H Portal de Usme
- H Danubio
- H Molinos
- H Consuelo
- H Socorro
- H Santa Lucía
- H Calle 40 Sur
- H Quiroga
- H Olaya
- H Restrepo
- H Fucha
- H Nariño
- H Hortúa
- H Hospital

=== Caracas Sur (Ramal del Tunal) ===
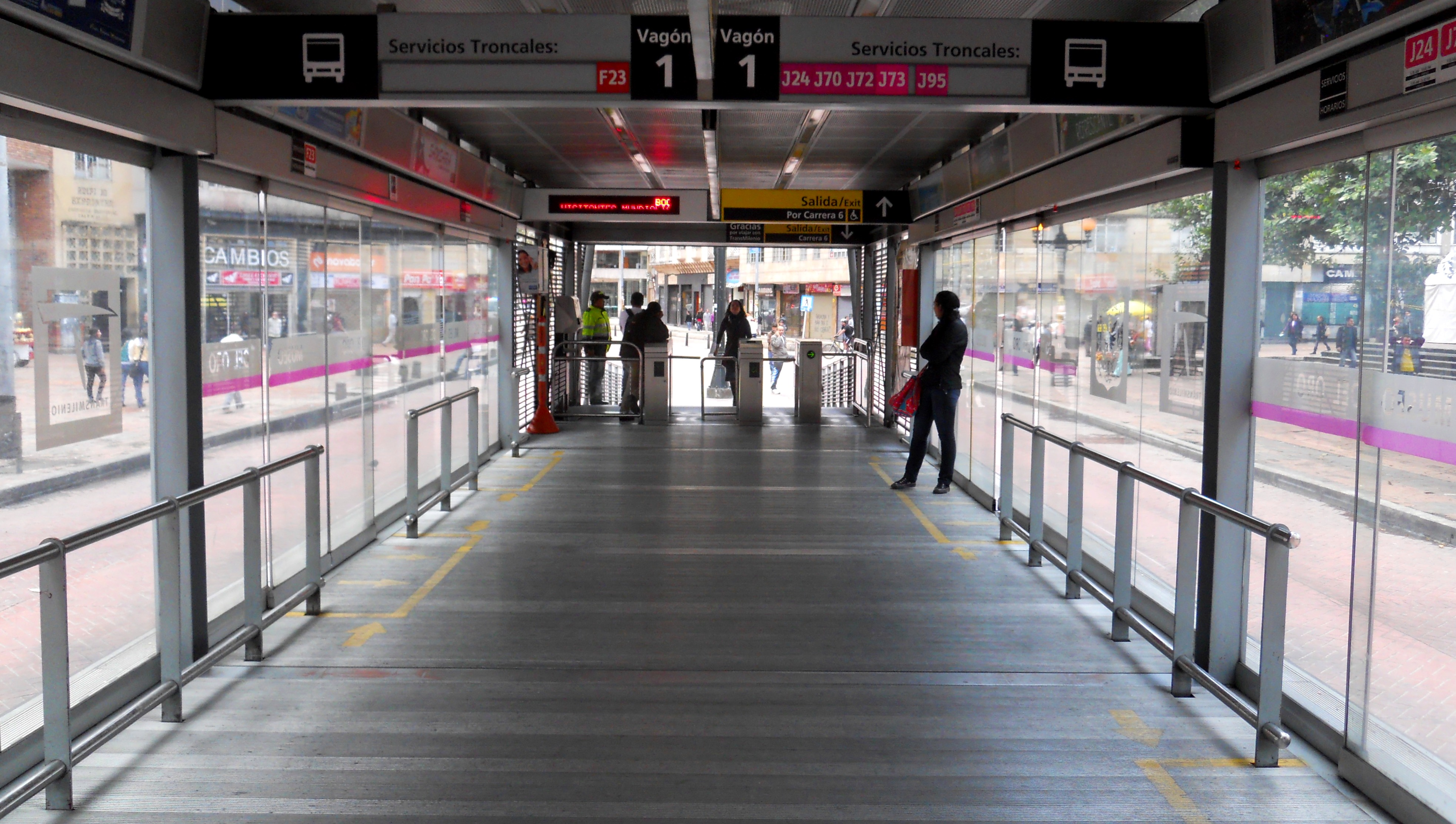
Museo del Oro station

(From west to east)

- H Portal del Tunal
- H Parque
- H Biblioteca

== Eje Ambiental ==
(From east to west)

- J Las Aguas
- J Museo del Oro
- J Universidades

== Avenida El Dorado ==
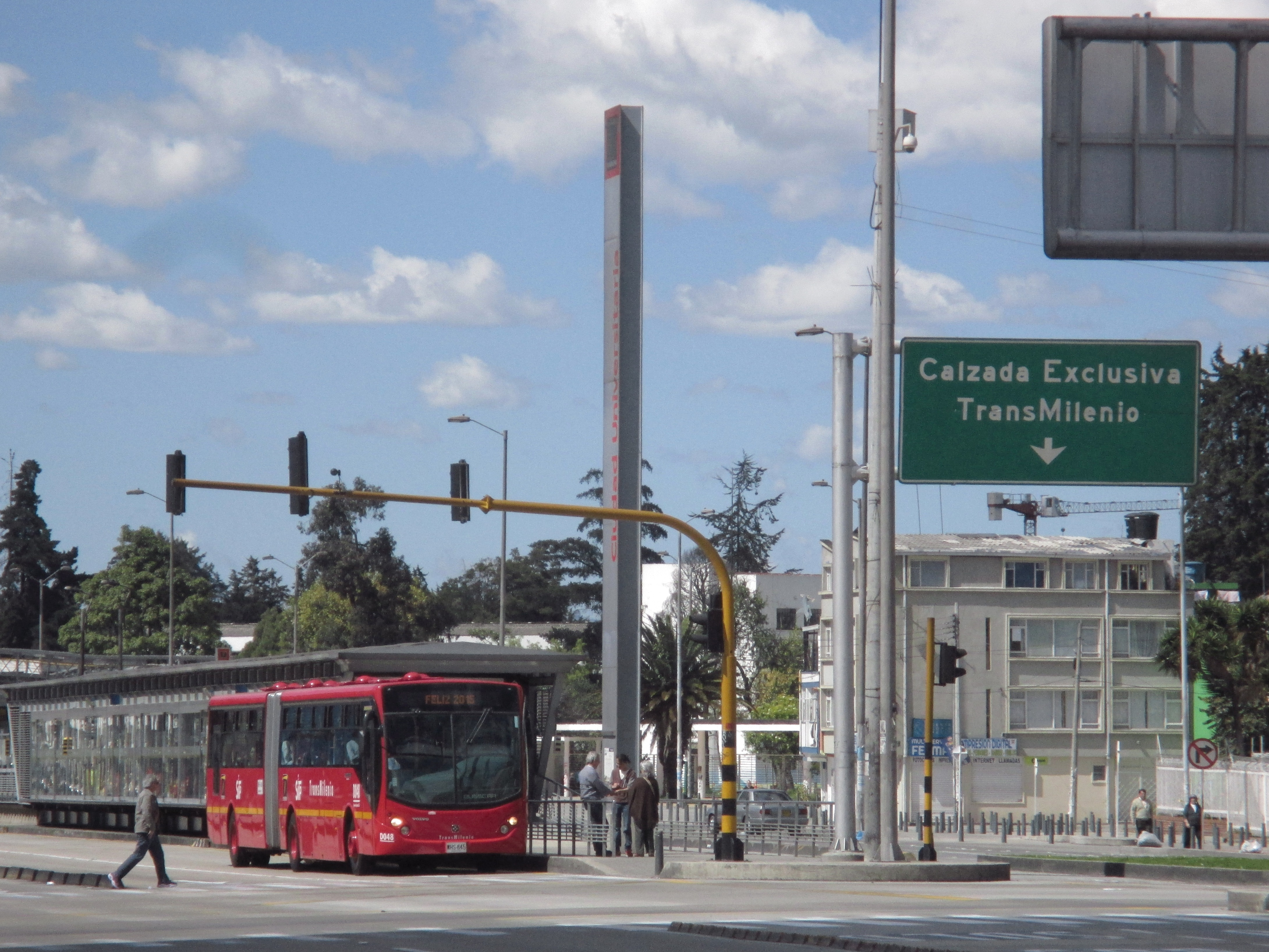
Ciudad Universitaria station

(From west to east)

- K Portal ElDorado
- K Modelia
- K Normandía
- K Av. Rojas
- K El Tiempo - Maloka
- K Salitre Greco
- K CAN
- K Gobernación
- K Quinta Paredes
- K Recinto Ferial
- K Ciudad Universitaria
- K Concejo de Bogotá
- K Centro Memoria
- K Estación Central

== Carrera 10 ==
(From south to north)

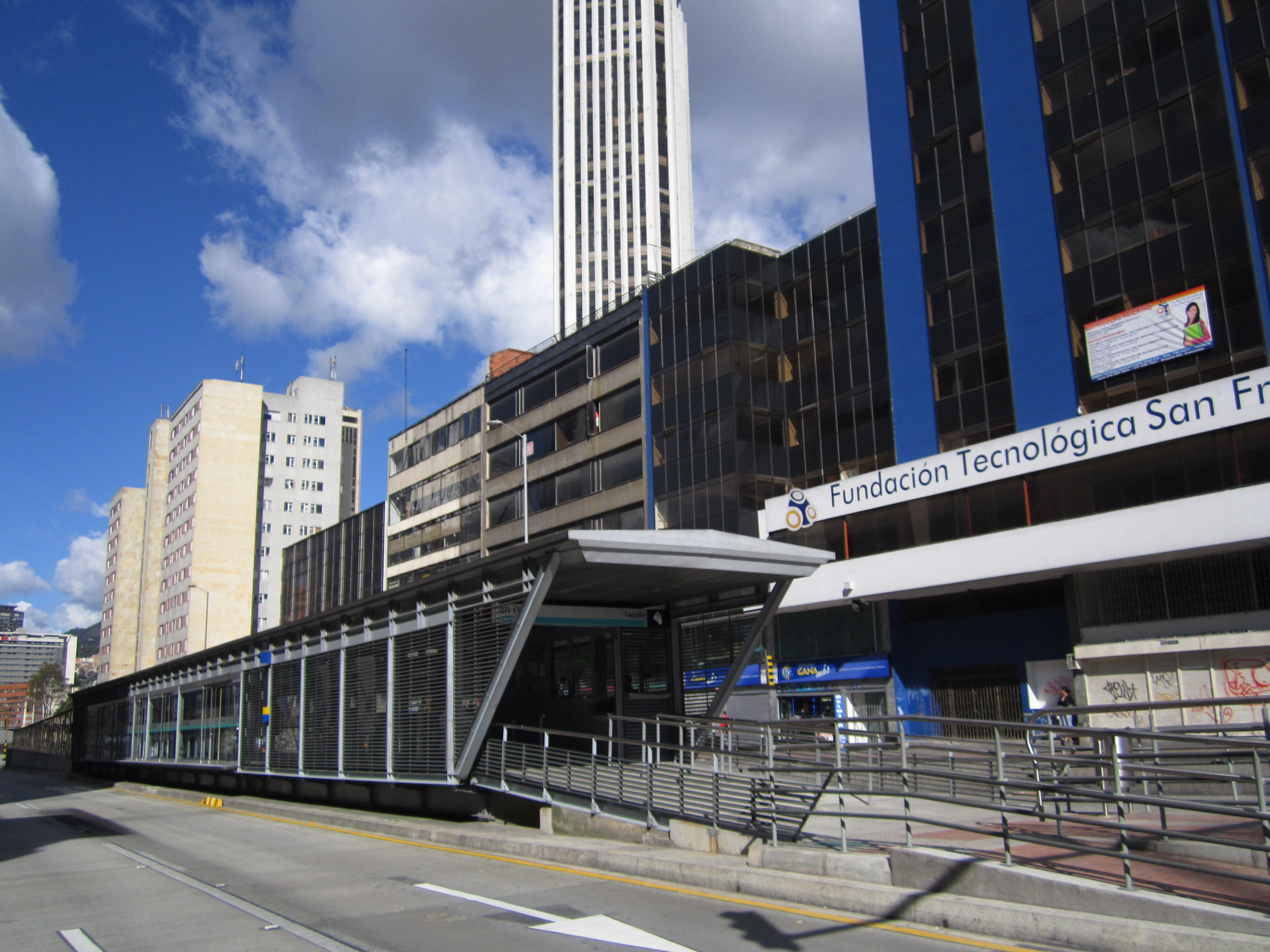
San Diego station

- L Portal 20 de Julio
- L Country Sur
- L Av. 1 de Mayo
- L Ciudad Jardín
- L Policarpa
- L San Bernando
- L Bicentenario
- L San Victorino Neos Centro
- L Las Nieves
- L San Diego

== Carrera Séptima ==
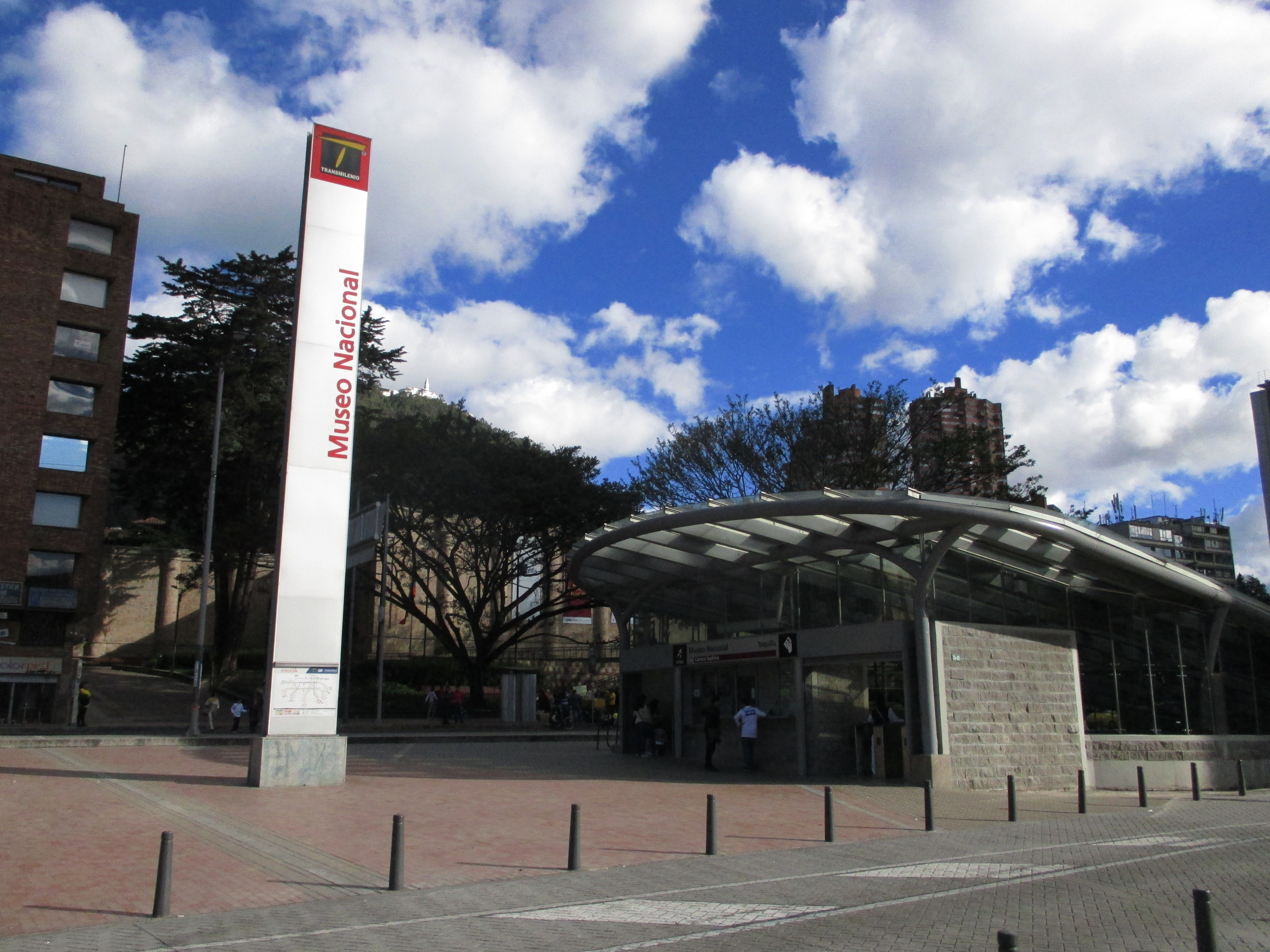
Museo Nacional station

(From south to north)

- M Museo Nacional

== Avenida Ciudad de Cali ==
(From north to south)

- Z Islandia
- Z Los Laureles
- Z Tibanica – Primavera

== See also ==
- Bogotá
- TransMilenio
