= Calle 127 (TransMilenio) =

Bus station in Bogotá, Colombia

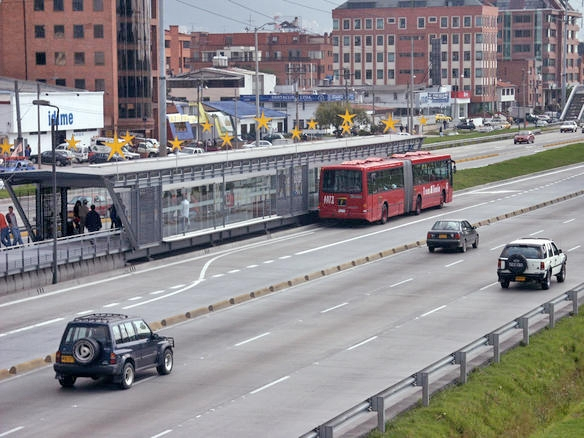

General information
- Location: Usaquén and Suba (Bogotá); Colombia

History
- Opened: 2001

Services
Preceding station	TransMilenio	Following station
Prado towards Terminal	B	Pepe Sierra towards Héroes
Location

The simple station Calle 127 is part of the TransMilenio mass-transit system of Bogotá, Colombia, which opened in the year 2000.

== Location ==
The station is located in northern Bogotá, specifically on Autopista Norte with Calle 125.

It serves the Santa Bárbara Occidental and La Calleja neighbourhoods. It is the nearest station to the shopping districts of Avenida Calle 127 (Avenida Rodrigo Lara Bonilla) and Avenida Carrera 19.

Many passengers use this station to go to Unicentro, the second-largest mall in the city.

== History ==
After the opening of the Portal de Usme in early 2001, the Autopista Norte line was opened. This station was added as a northerly expansion of that line, which was completed with the opening of the Portal del Norte later that year.

The station is named Calle 127 due to its proximity to that road.

== Station Services ==
=== Old trunk services ===
Services rendered until April 29, 2006
Kind	Routes	Frequency
Current		Every 3 minutes on average
Express	Expreso 50 Expreso 60 Expreso 70 Expreso 100 Expreso 150	Every 2 minutes on average
Express Dominical	Expreso Dominical 25	Every 3 or 4 minutes on average

=== Main line service ===
Service as of April 29, 2006
Type	Northwards	Southwards	Frequency
Local	8	8	Every three minutes
Express Monday through Saturday; All day	B12 / B14 / B18 / B72 / B73	G12 / F14 / L18 / H61 / H74	Every two minutes
Express Monday through Friday; Morning rush		J70 / A74	Every two minutes
Express Saturday; Evening Rush		H73	Every two minutes
Express Sunday and holidays	B92	H92	Every 3–4 minutes

=== Feeder routes ===
This station does not have connections to feeder routes.

=== Inter-city service ===
This station does not have inter-city service.

== See also ==
- Bogotá
- TransMilenio
- List of TransMilenio Stations
