= La Conejera Hill =

Hill in Colombia

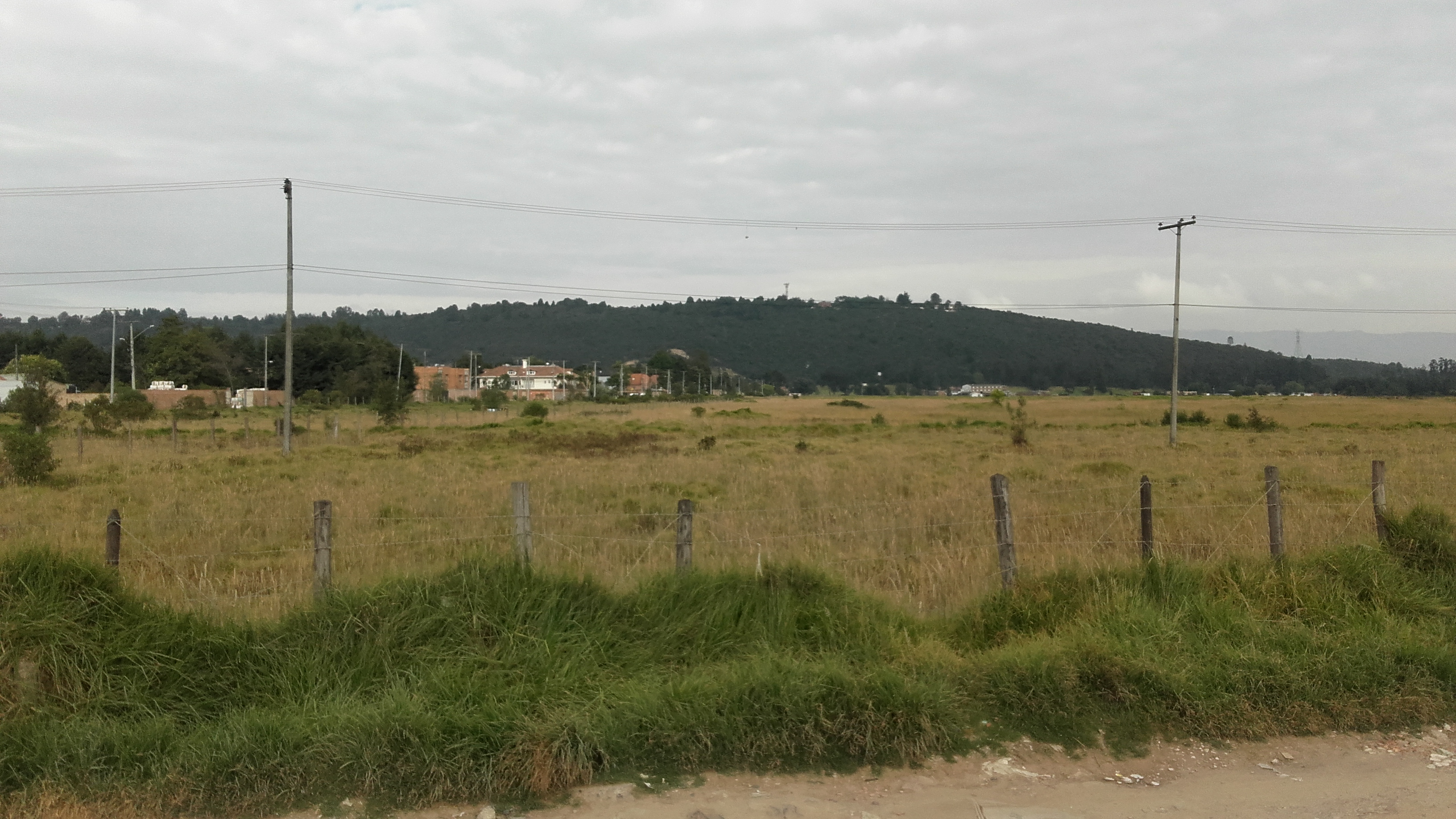

Highest point
- Elevation: 2,680 m (8,790 ft)
- Coordinates: 4°46′28″N 74°04′01″W

Naming
- Native name: Cerro La Conejera (Spanish)

Geography
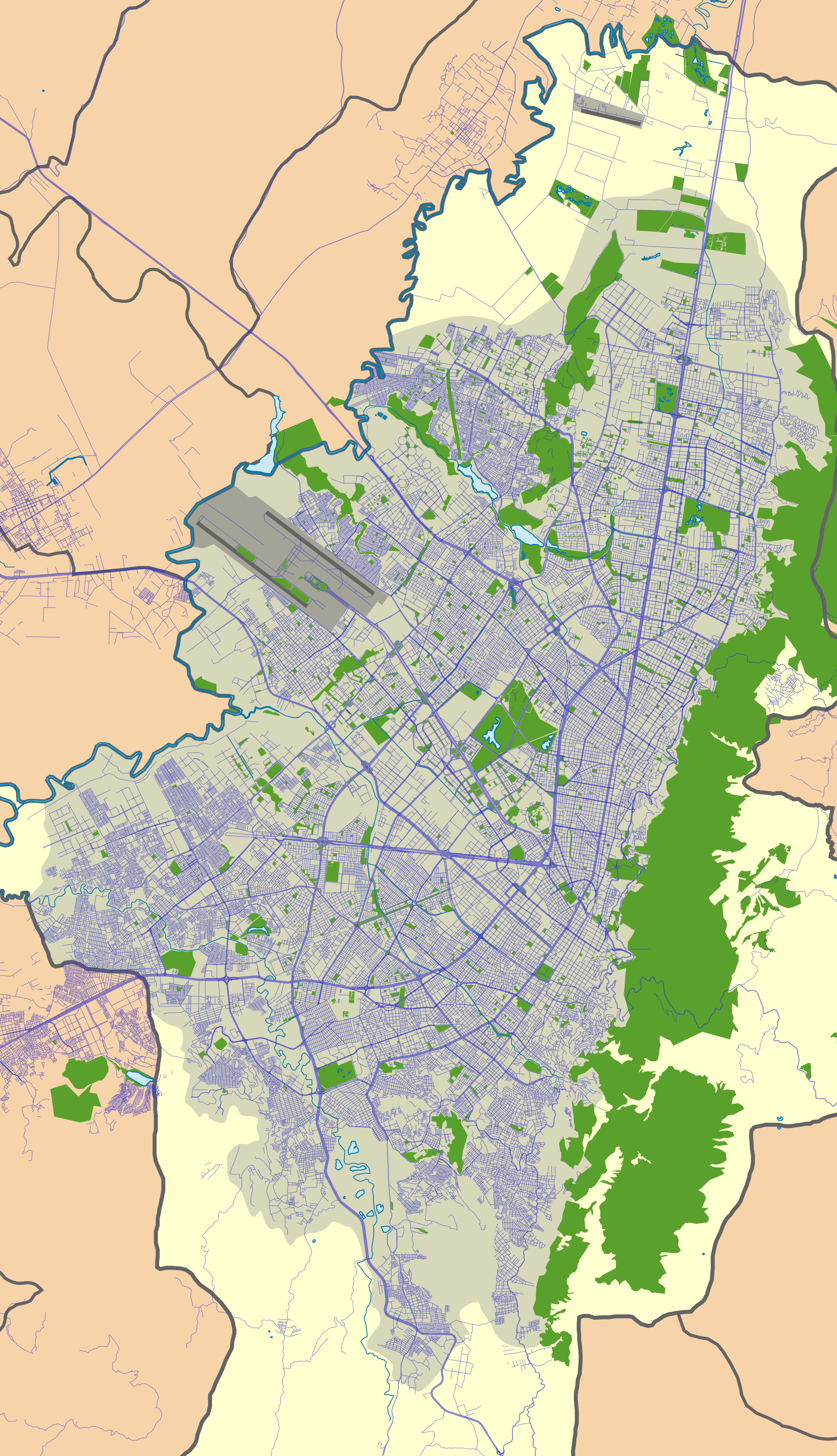
- Location within Bogotá
- City: Bogotá, Colombia
- Parent range: Eastern Ranges; Andes

La Conejera Hill is a 2,680-metre (8,790 ft) high hill located in the north of Bogotá, Colombia. It has an area of 161.4 ha (399 acres), a prominence of 115 m (377 ft), and a height of 2,680 m (8,790 ft). It is an extended hill in a south-north direction, occupying the area between Calles 170 and 200, and Carreras 80 and 90. It borders the Thomas van der Hammen Natural Reserve, and is one of the sources of water recharge for wetland of La Conejera and other areas in the north of Bogotá. According to the District Environment Secretariat, La Conejera Hill is "one of the most important protected areas of District land in the city", due to its proximity to the urban area. There is a residential complex and multiple houses on the hill, in addition to the Antares Naval Club.

== Recent years ==
The resolution of 20 November 2014 of the District Environment Secretariat expanded the protected area of La Conejera Hill. Likewise, violations have been reported against the protected area of the hill, such as the deposit of construction debris, tires, and plastic waste, among others. In July 2015 alone, the local Suba mayor's office imposed 37 sanctions against the invaders.
