= San Martín (TransMilenio) =

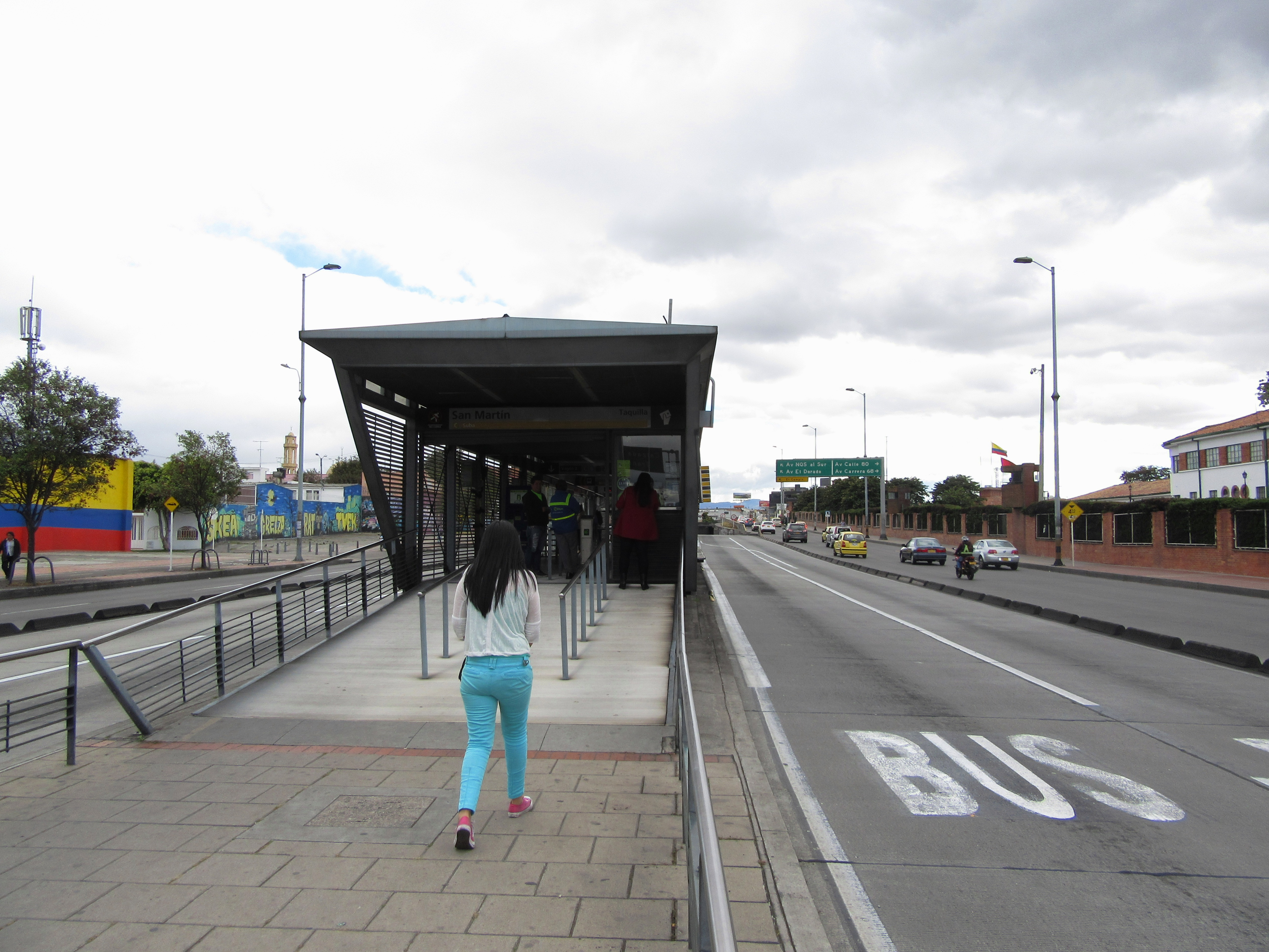

General information
- Location: Avenida Suba with Calle 83; Suba, Bogotá; Colombia

History
- Opened: April 29, 2006

Services
Preceding station	TransMilenio	Following station
Rionegro towards Portal de Suba	C	Terminus
Location

San Martín is a simple station, part of the TransMilenio mass-transit system of Bogotá, Colombia.

== Location ==
The station is located in northwestern Bogotá, specifically on Avenida Suba with Calle 83.

== History ==
In 2006, phase two of the TransMilenio system was completed, including the Avenida Suba line, on which this station is located.

The station is named San Martín for the neighborhood of the same name located to the east of the station.

== Station services ==
=== Main line service ===
Service as of April 29, 2006
Type	Northwards	Southwards	Frequency
Local	7	7	Every three minutes
Express Monday through Saturday; Morning rush		J73	Every two minutes
Express Monday through Saturday; Evening rush	C73		Every two minutes
Express Monday through Friday; Mixed service, rush and non-rush	C17	H17	Every two minutes
Express Saturday; All day	C17	H17	Every two minutes

=== Feeder routes ===
This station does not have connections to feeder routes.

=== Inter-city service ===
This station does not have inter-city service.

== See also ==
- List of TransMilenio Stations
