= Portal de Suba (TransMilenio) =

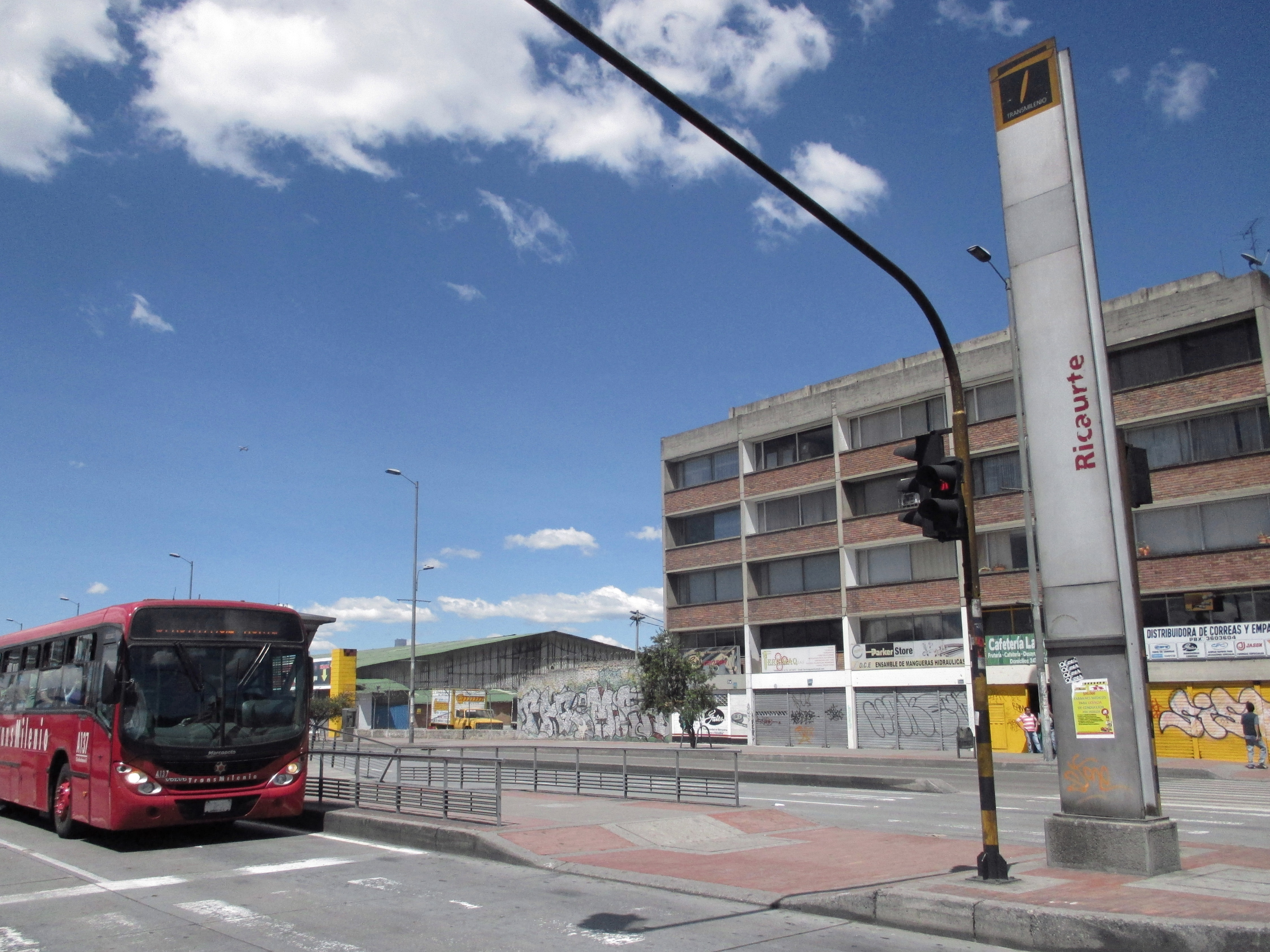

General information
- Location: Avenida Suba with Avenida Ciudad de Cali; Suba (Bogotá); Colombia

History
- Opened: April 29, 2006

Services
Preceding station	TransMilenio	Following station
Terminus	C	La Campiña towards San Martín
Location

Portal de Suba is one of the terminus stations of the TransMilenio mass-transit system of Bogotá, Colombia, which opened in the year 2000.

== Location ==
Portal de Suba is located in northwestern Bogotá, specifically on Avenida Suba with Avenida Ciudad de Cali.

== History ==
The station opened April 29, 2006 after several months of construction delays on the line. The largest delay was in the construction of the underpass at the intersection of Avenida Suba with NQS and Avenida Calle 80.

It is one of the two termini that serve the locality of Suba (the other being the Portal del Norte).

Nearby is the Imperial shopping center, with its anchor Carrefour and the Éxito of Suba.

== Station services ==
=== Main line service ===
Services rendered since April 29, 2006
Kind	Routes to the North	Routes to the East	Routes to the West	South Routes
Local				7
Express Monday to Saturday all day			F19	H15
Express Monday to Friday peak rush hour	B56	J73		
Express Monday to Saturday; Mixed service, rush and non-rush	B50			F29
Express Monday to Friday rush morning and afternoon				H17 G30
Express Saturdays all day				H17
Express Saturdays from 5:00 a.m. At 3:00 p.m.				G30
Express on Sundays and holidays			F91	G96
Routes ending the journey
Easy route	7			
Express Monday to Saturday all day	C15 C19			
Express Monday to Friday afternoon Off-peak	C73			
Express Monday to Saturday peak hour morning and afternoon	C17 C29 C61			
Express Monday to Friday peak hour morning and afternoon	C17 C30			
Express Saturdays all day	C17			
Express Saturdays from 5:00 a.m. At 3:00 p.m.	C30			
Express on Sundays and holidays	C91 C96			

=== Feeder routes ===
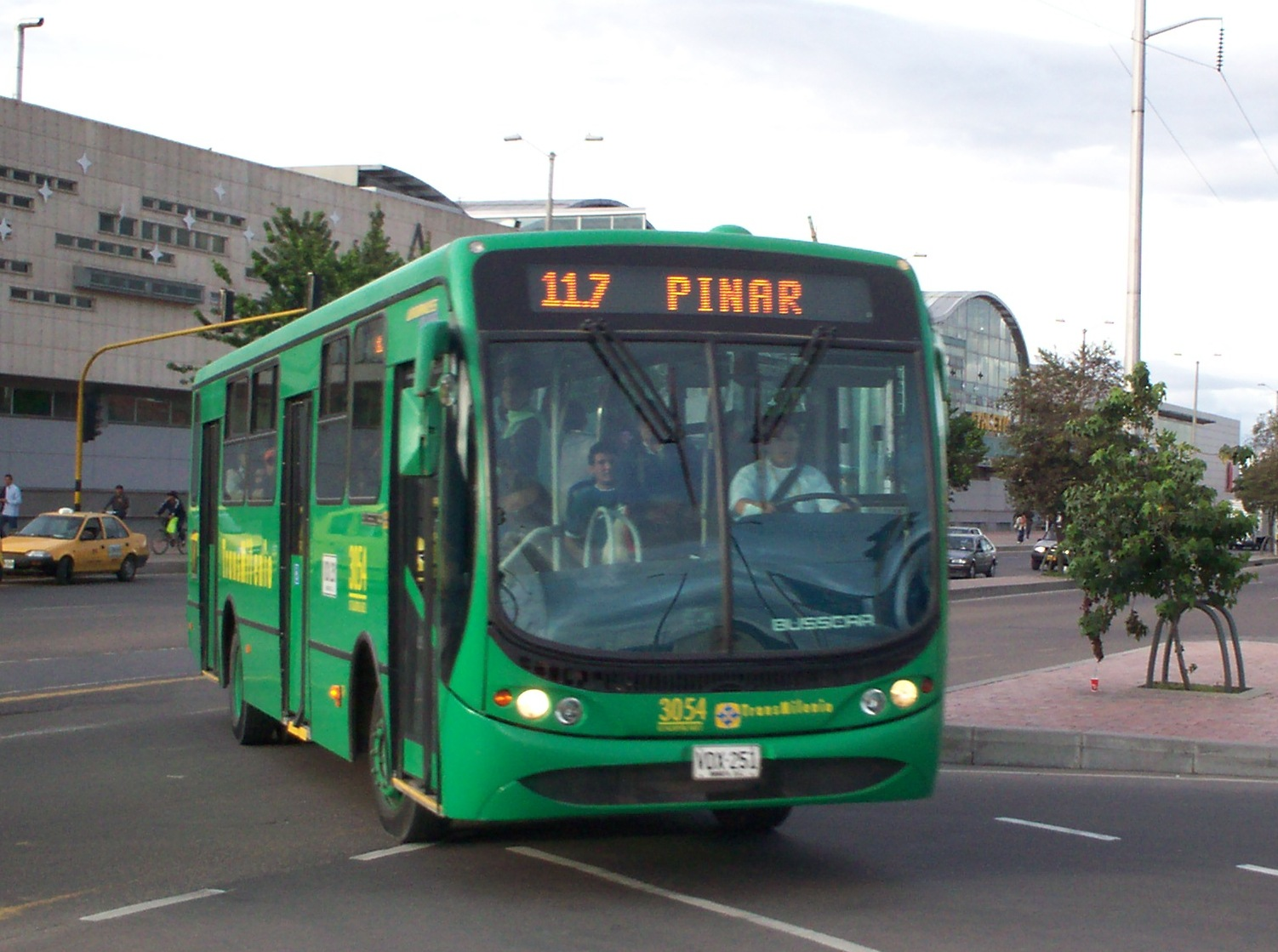
Feeder bus entering the Portal of Suba.

The station has the following feeder routes:

- 11.1 Avenida Suba loop
- 11.2 San Andrés loop
- 11.3 Villamaría loop
- 11.4 Aures loop
- 11.5 Avenida Cali loop
- 11.6 Las Mercedes loop
- 11.7 Pinar loop
- 11.8 La Gaitana loop
- 11.9 Lisboa loop
- 11.10 Bilbao loop

== Intermunicipal services ==
In the outside part of the Portal of Suba there is a Satellite Transport Parabiter from where they leave intermunicipal buses with different destinies to the nearby municipalities like Cota and Chía.

== See also ==
- Bogotá
- TransMilenio
- List of TransMilenio Stations
