= Avenida Suba =

Road in Bogotá, Colombia

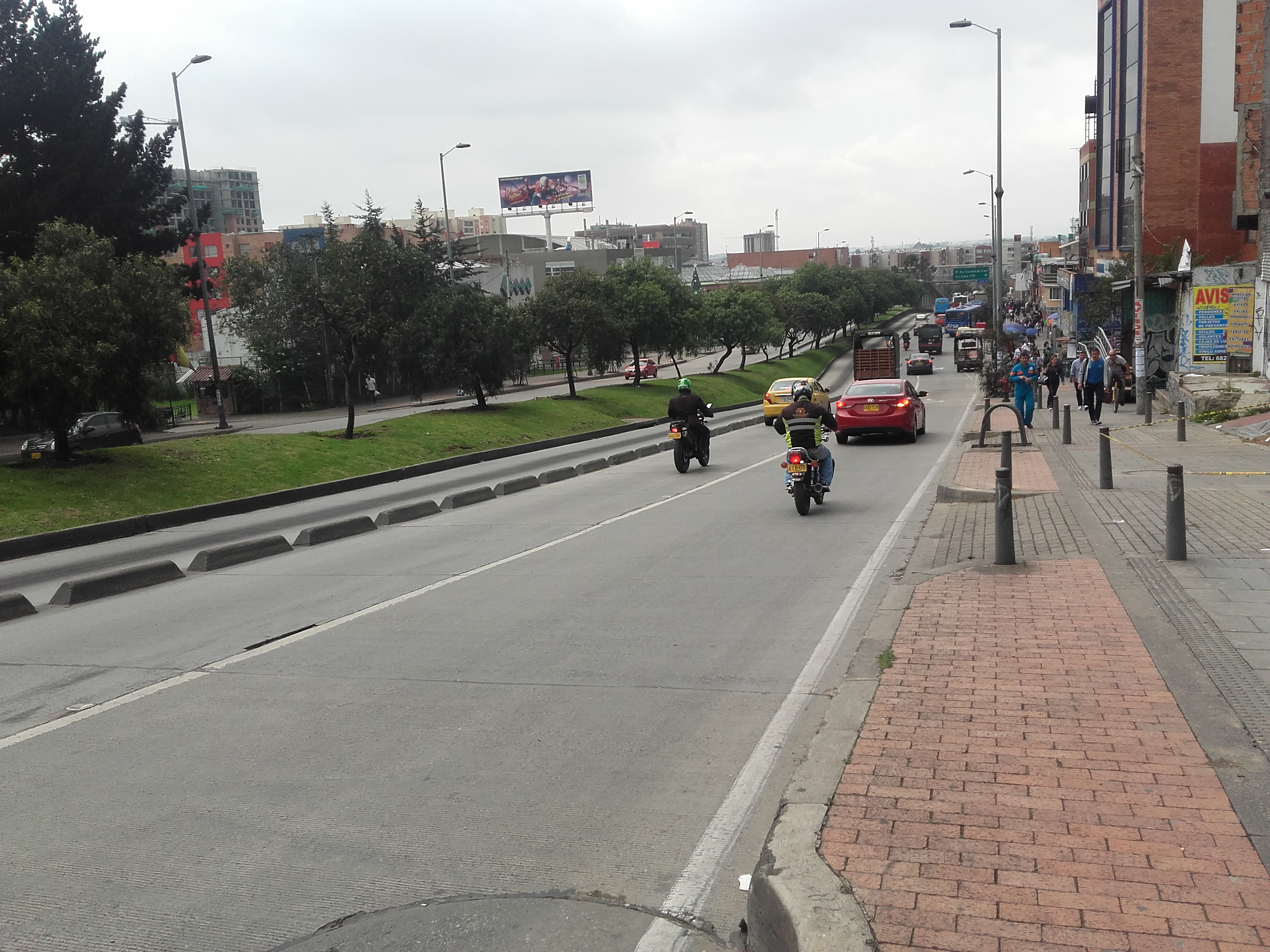
- Avenida Suba

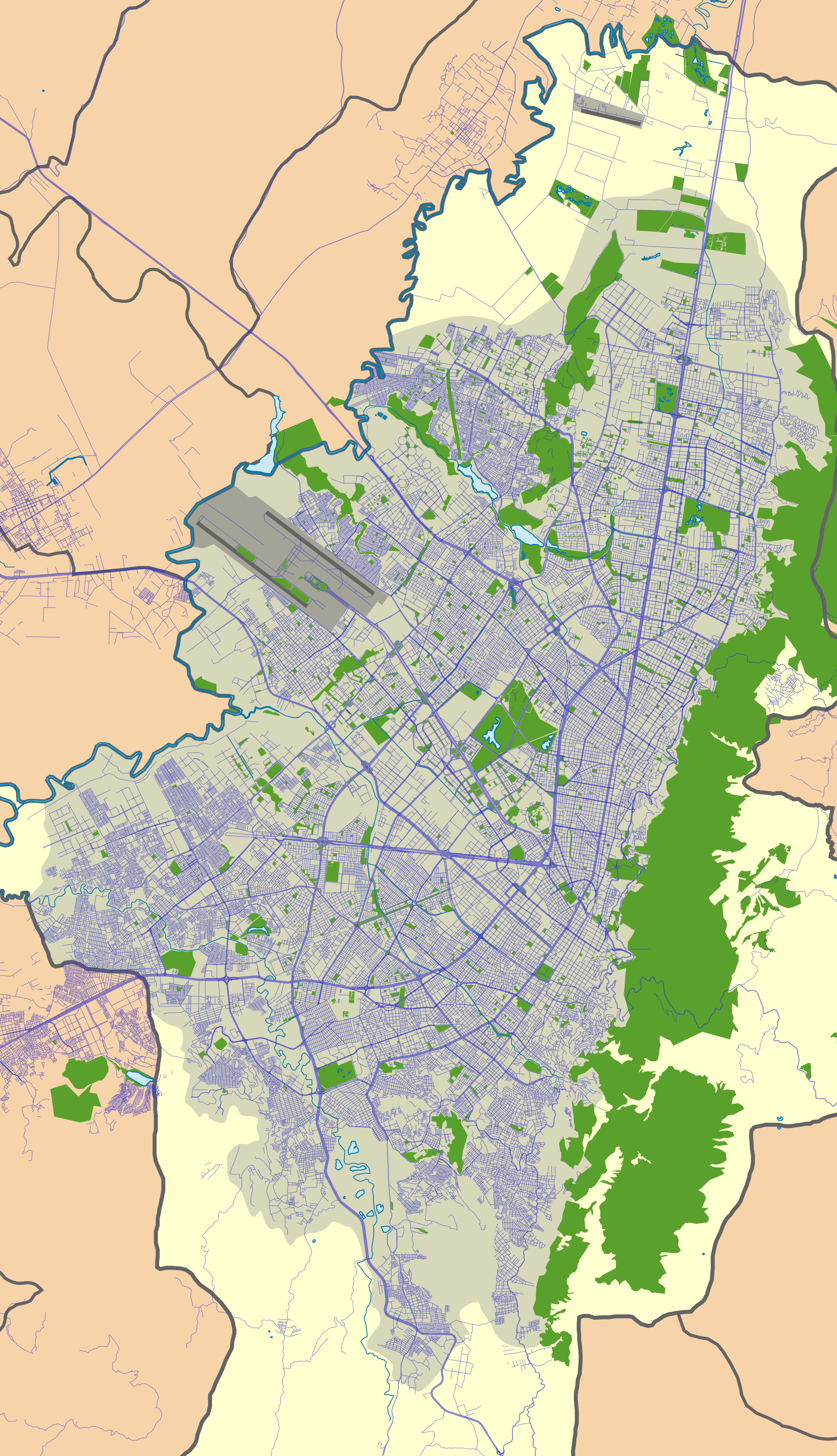
- Location within Bogotá
- Namesake: Muysccubun: Suba
- Location: Bogotá; Colombia
- Coordinates: 4°42′21″N 74°04′15″W
- South end: Avenida Calle 80
- North end: Avenida Ciudad de Cali

Avenida Suba is a major road in northern Bogotá, Colombia, connecting the locality of Suba with the rest of the capital.

== Etymology ==
Avenida Suba is named after the locality Suba. Suba is either derived from the Chibcha contraction Suba, meaning "Flower of the Sun" (uba = "fruit" or "flower", sua = "Sun", minus its last vowel, making it a possessive) or from the words sua (Sun) and sie (water). It is also known as Troncal Suba due to being one of the main lines in the TransMilenio system.

== Route ==
Its southern end begins at the intersection of Avenida NQS with Calle 80 in the locality of Barrios Unidos. It runs north entering Suba at Calle 100. At the shopping center Centro Suba it splits into two, turning into Avenida Transversal de Suba (Calle 145) and Antigua Avenida de Suba (Calle 139).

== Points of interest along the route ==
- The Portal de Suba of the TransMilenio system
- Iserra 100 shopping center
- Bulevar Niza shopping center
- Centro Suba shopping center
- The Colina Campestre neighborhood

== Gallery ==
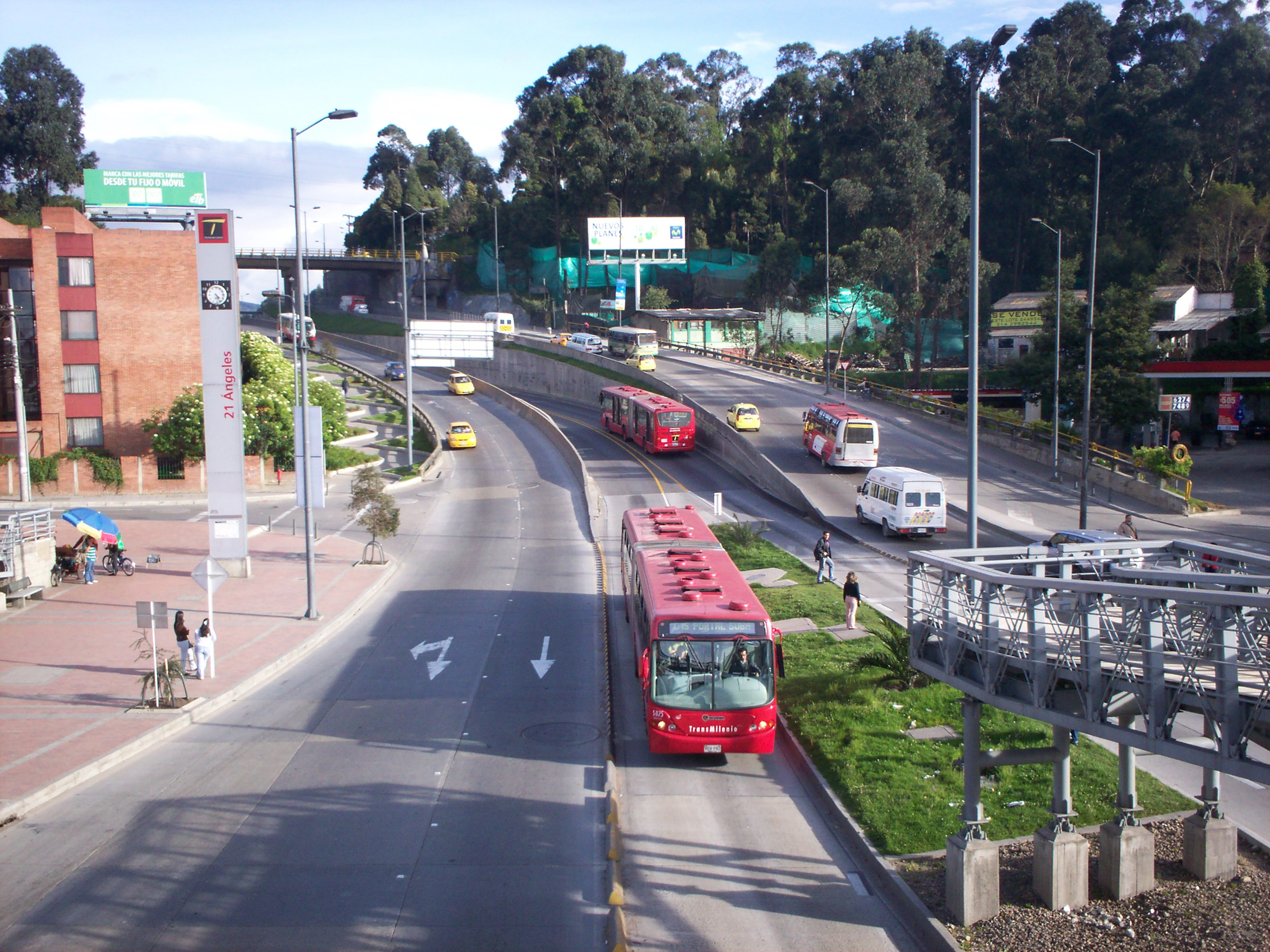
21 Ángeles station of Transmilenio on Avenida Suba

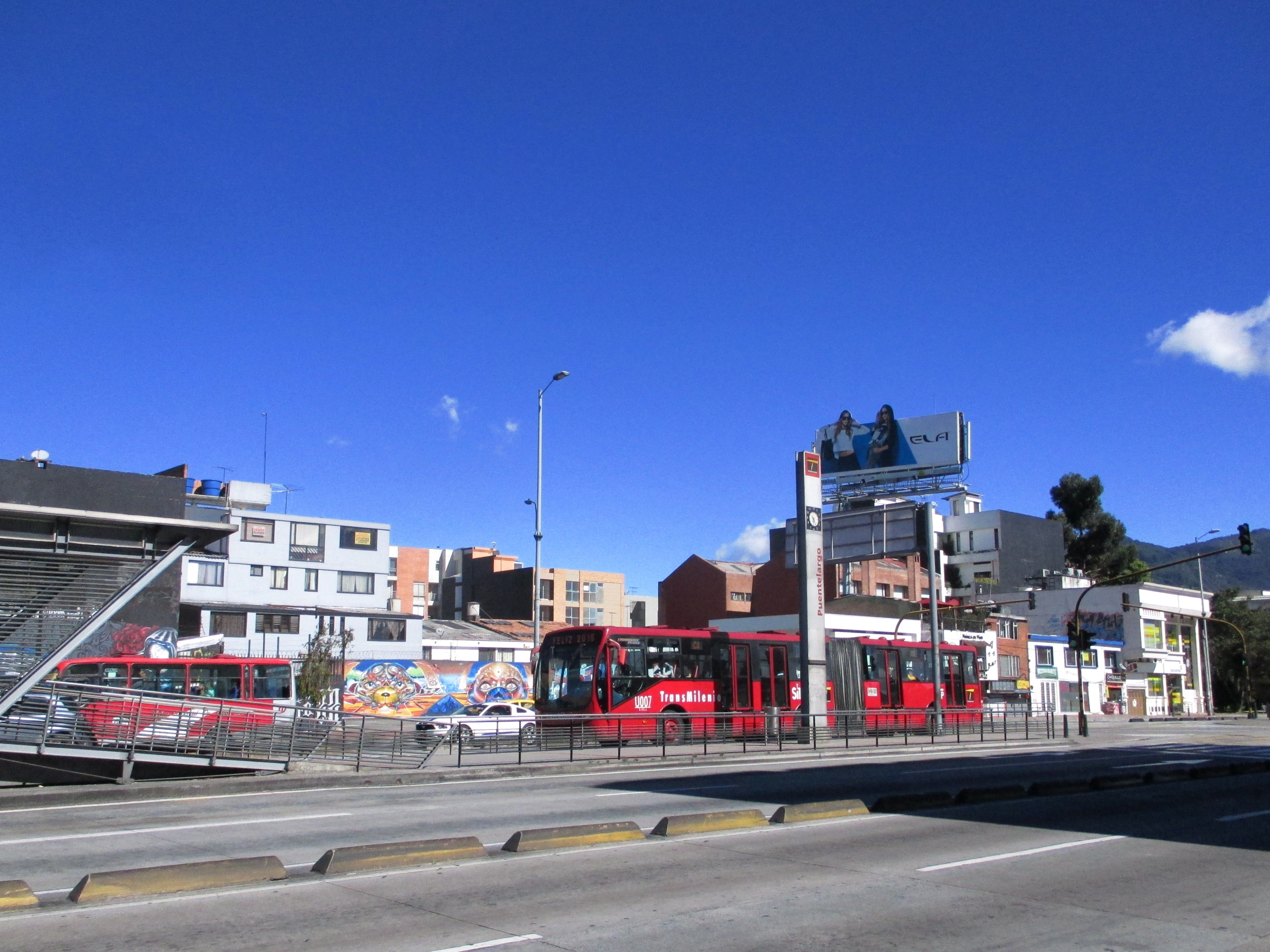
Puentelargo station of Transmilenio on Avenida Suba
