= Marly, Bogotá =

Marly
- Neighborhood
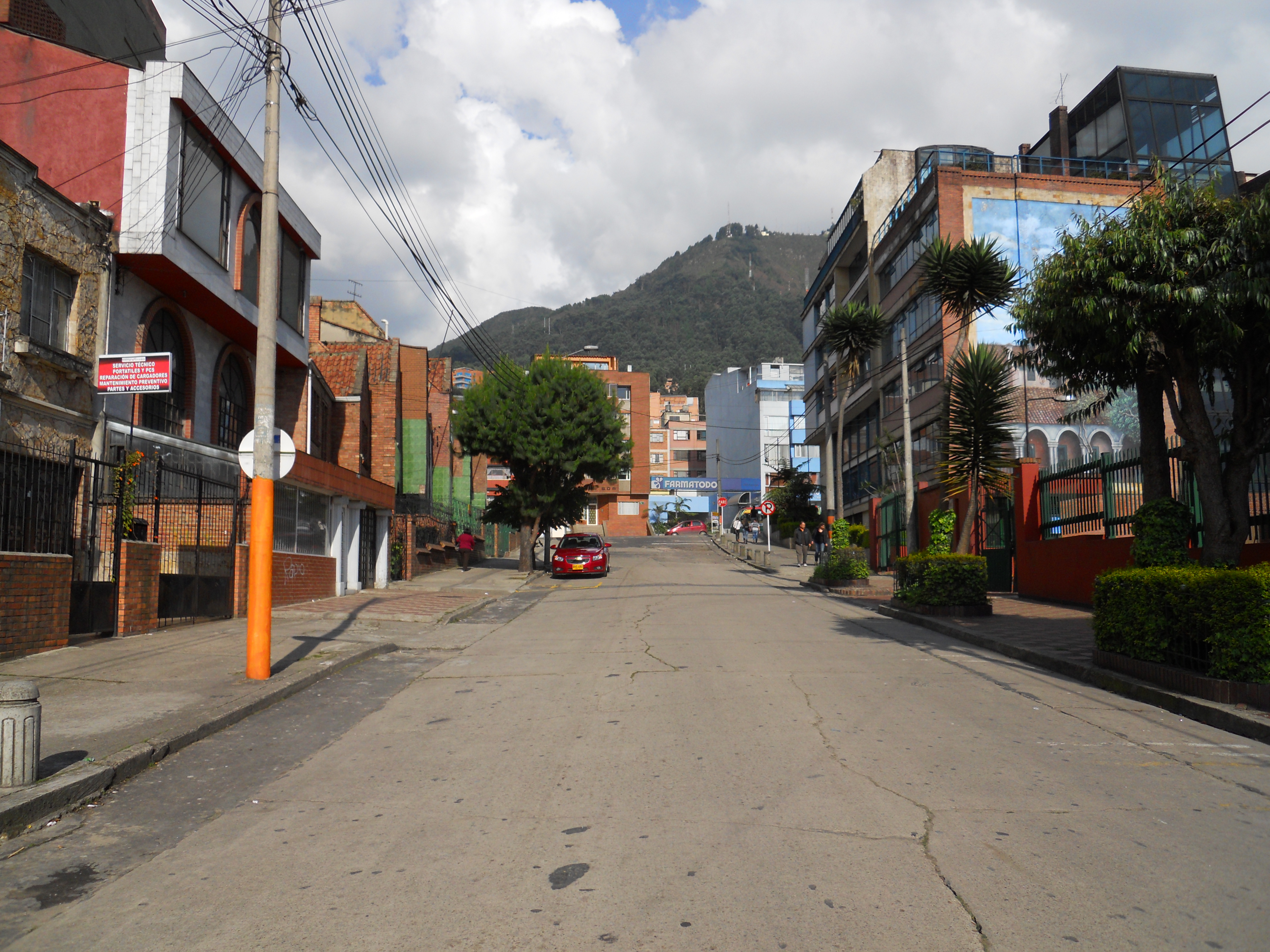
- Calle 51

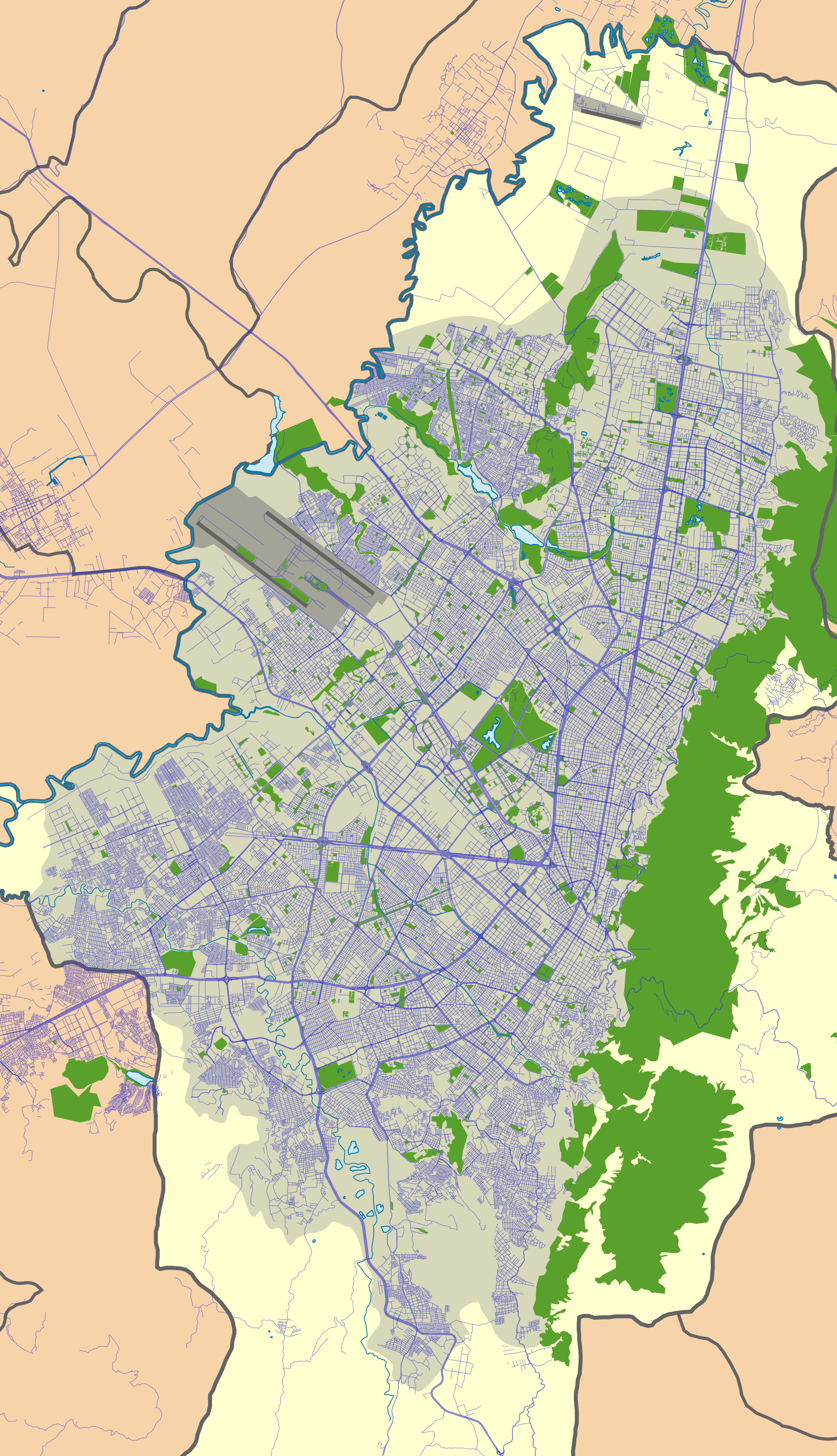
- Location in Bogotá
- Coordinates: 4.6334388°N 74.0659959°W
- Country: Colombia
- City: Bogotá
- Barrio: Marly
- Locality: Chapinero, Teusaquillo
- Established: 1903

Population (2018)
  - Total: 60.500
  - Demonym: Bogotano
- Time zone: UTC-5 (Colombia Time (COT))
- Website: Alcaldía Local de Chapinero

Marly is a neighbourhood in the locality of Chapinero in Bogotá, Colombia.

== History ==
The community of Marly was founded in 1903, when a big house named Casaquinta de Marly was sold to a doctor named Carlos Esguerra in the neighborhood of Chapinero, He transformed it into a clinic, one of first modern private clinics of the city and country, associating with Drs. Manuel M. Lobo, Manuel Cantillo, Rafael Ucrós, Luis Felipe Calderón, Miguel Rueda, Rafael Rocha, Juan David Herrera, José María Lombana Barreneche, Julio Z. Torres y Pompilio Martínez.

The area where the clinic was became known as Marly, so the Mayor of Bogotá decided to formally name the barrio Marly, and it became a part of the locality number 2 of the City of Bogotá.

== Location ==
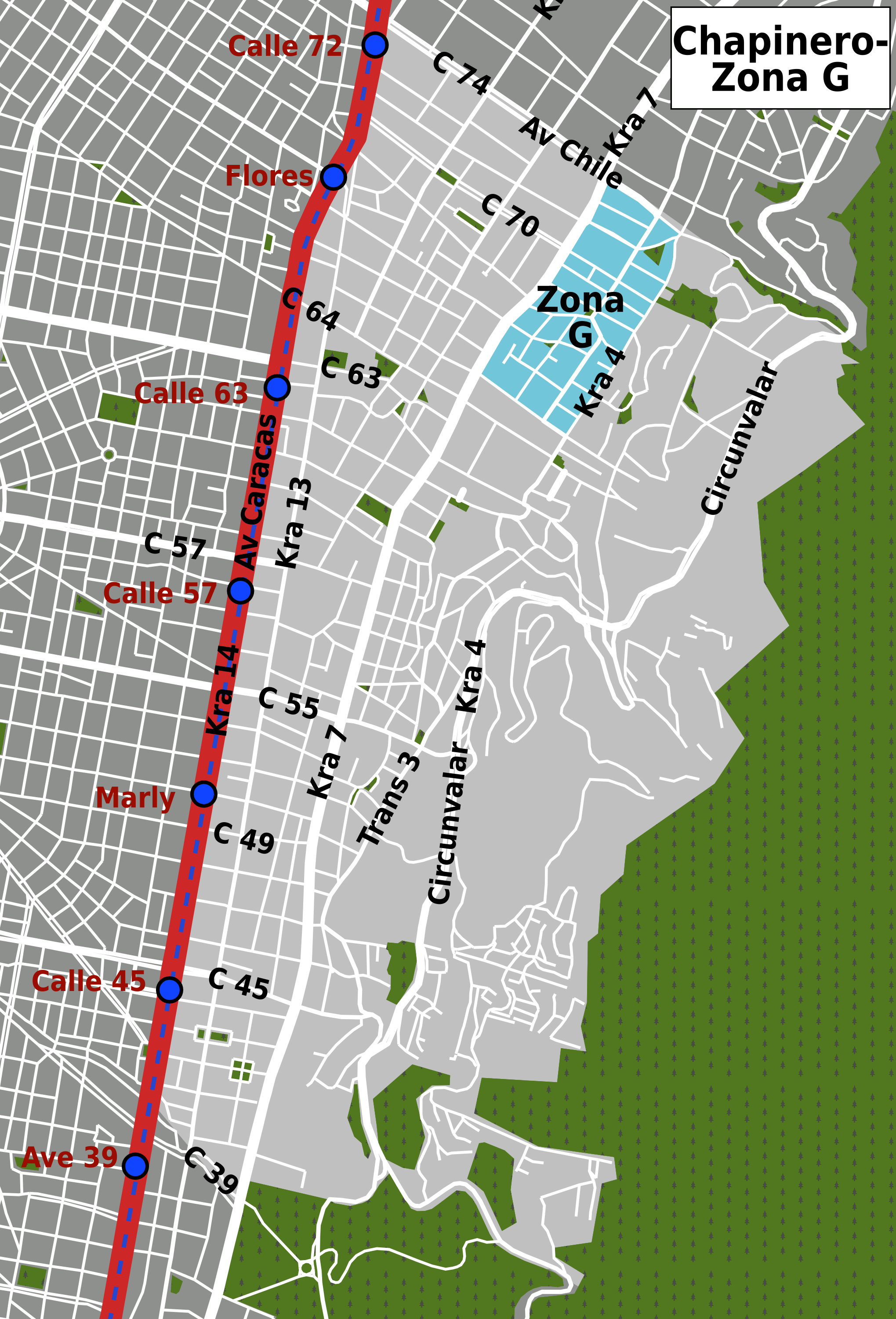
Marly Location in Chapinero's Zona G, between Calle 45 and Calle 55

Marly's borders Bogotá's downtown Centro Internacional de Bogotá to the south, and Central and North Chapinero to the north, including Zona G, the gourmet zone of the city where there are exclusive restaurants, including one of the best in Latin America, Zona T also borders to the north, with luxury commercial areas including boutiques bars and nightlife.

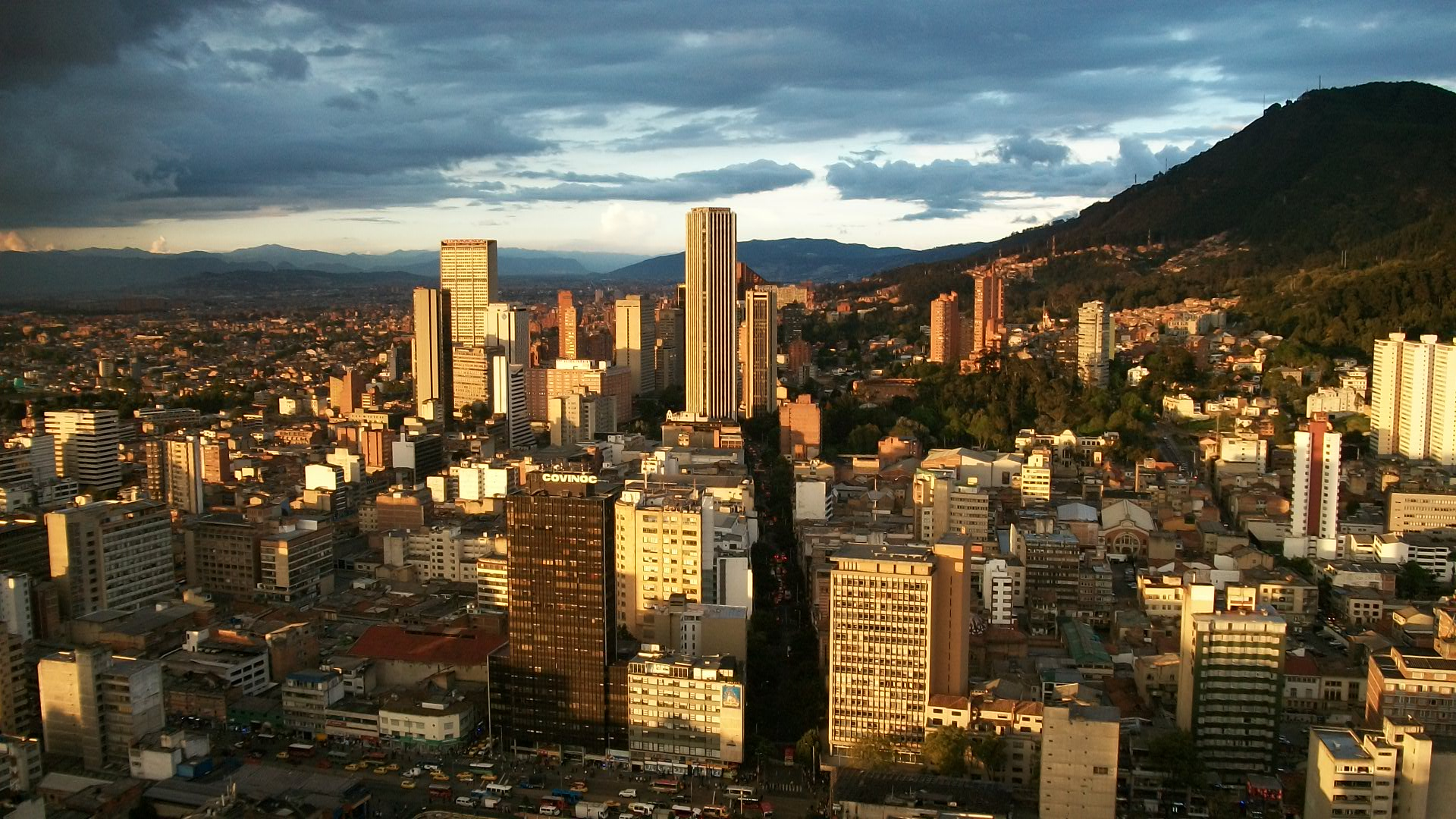
Bogotá's Downtown limits to the south with Marly

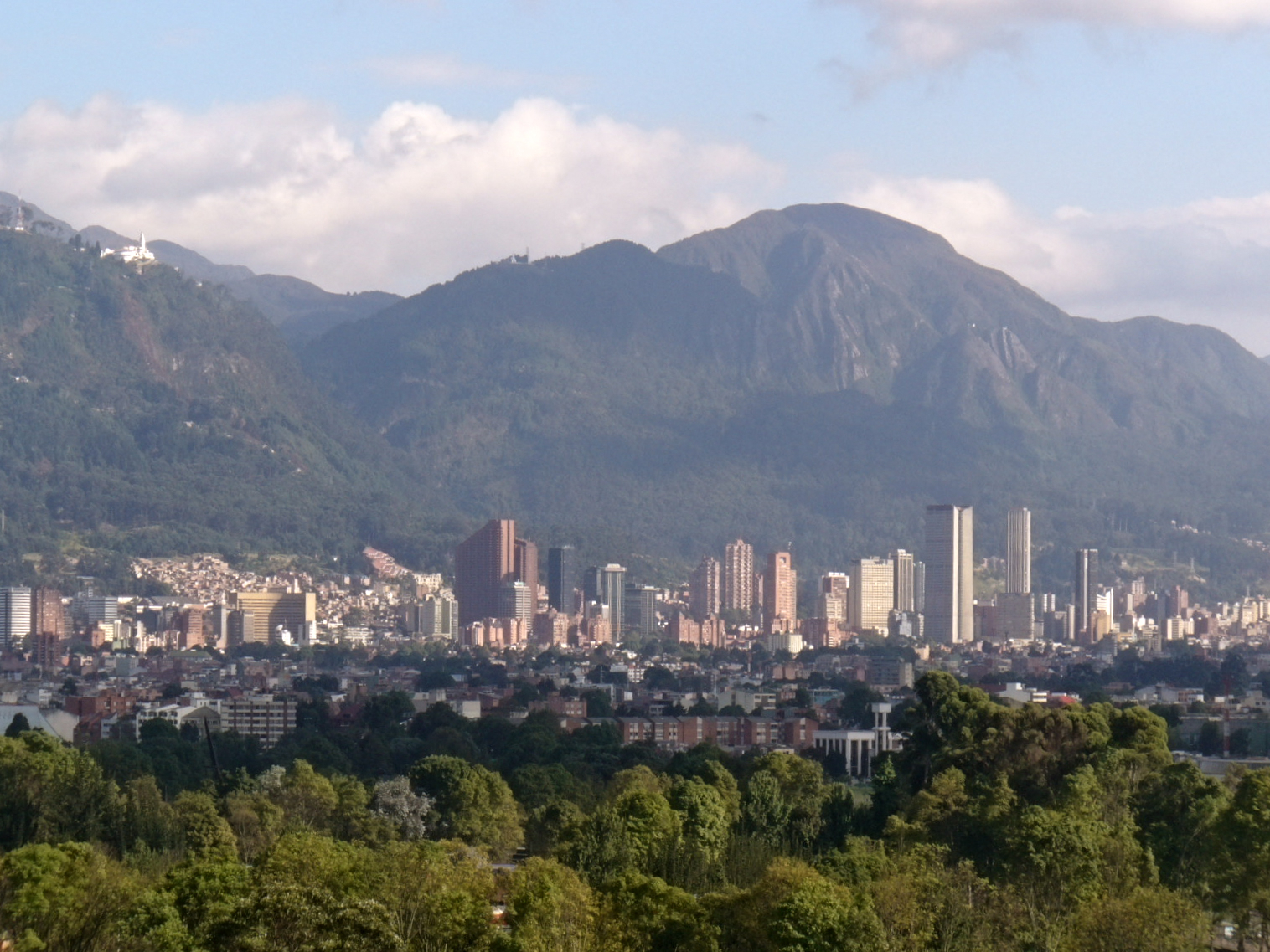
The Eastern Hills Limits to the East with Marly

To the east is Cerros Orientales a natural area of the Andes, where the ecotourists can hike and camp.

To the west is West Chapinero and Palermo, known for the best sports and events. The Movistar Arena Bogotá has hosted artists such as Demi Lovato, Miley Cyrus and Paul McCartney, and Estadio Nemesio Camacho a soccer stadium, which has hosted shows of Lady Gaga, One Direction, Coldplay, Foo Fighters, U2, Justin Bieber and Bruno Mars.

== Economy and culture ==
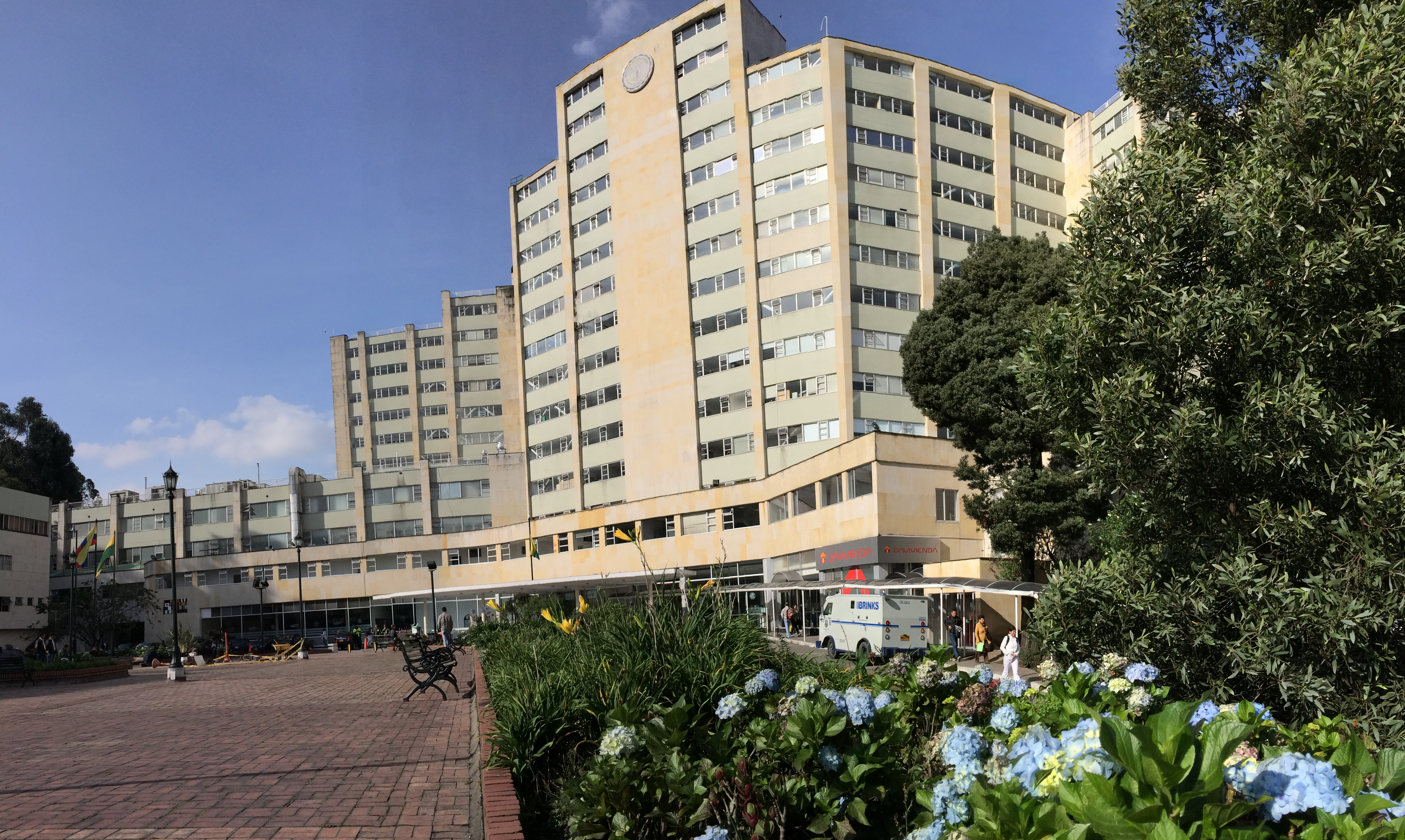
Central Militar Hospital, in Marly

Marly is known in Bogotá for having the most important hospitals of the city, including the Clinica de Marly and the Hospital Militar.

It is a wealthy neighbourhood, between the Avenida Caracas and the Avenida Alberto Lleras Camargo or La Septima.

== Parks and open space ==
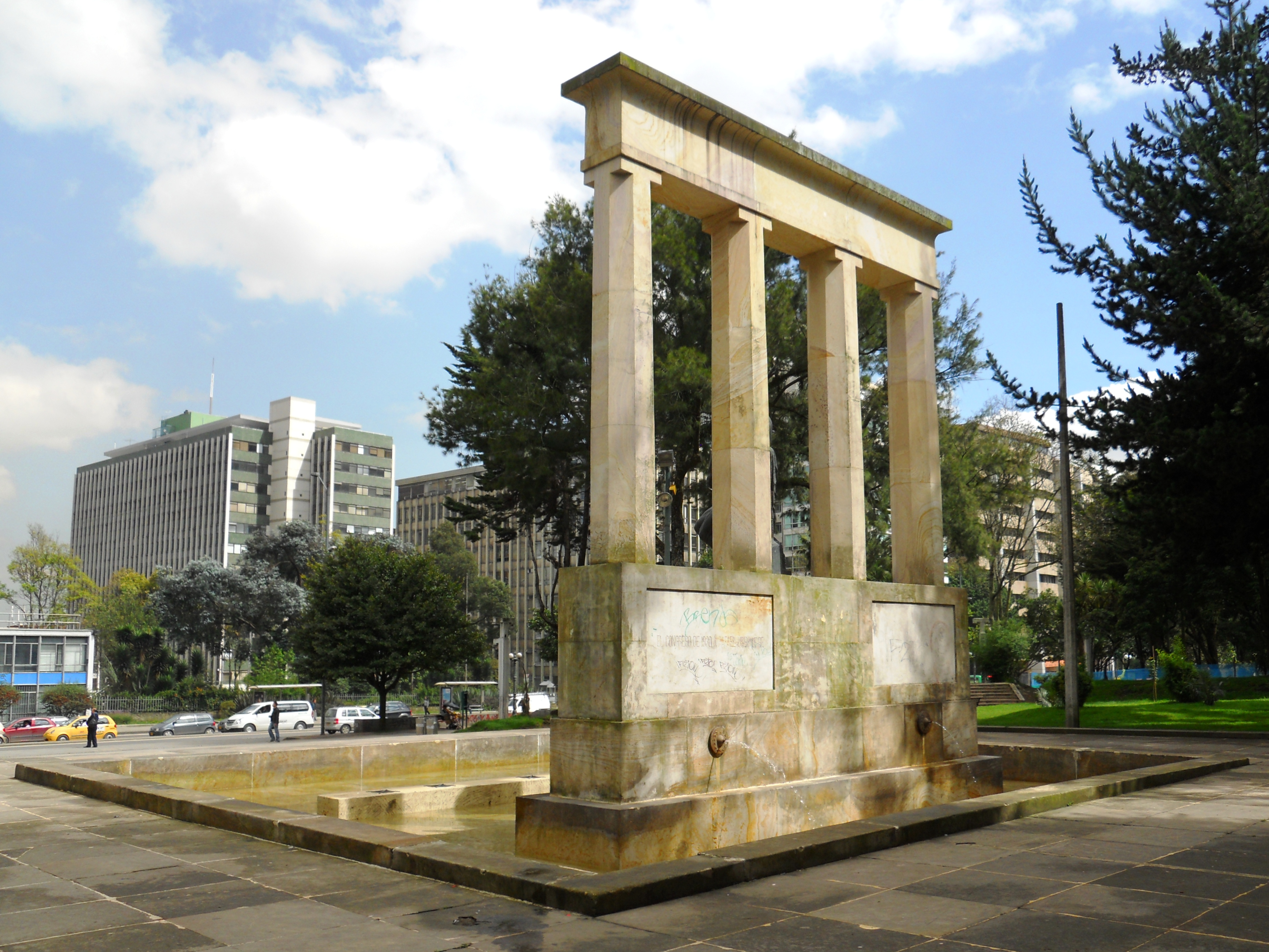
Central Park Enrique Olaya Herrera, located 1 km (less than a mile) to the south of Marly

Marly does not have parks or open spaces inside its neighborhood but nearby there are several public parks, plazas, gardens and other open space:

- Central Park Enrique Olaya Herrera
- Sucre || Park
- Portugal Park
- Hippies Park
- La Salle University Park
- San Luis Park

== Transportation ==
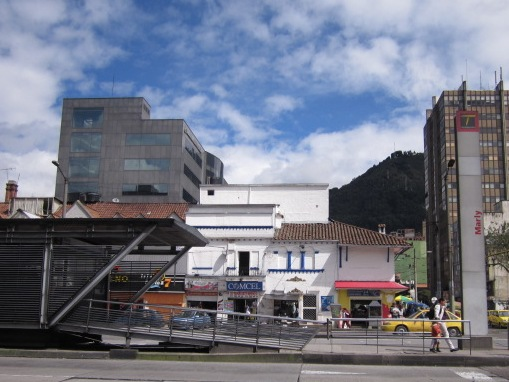
Marly's Transmilenio station

Marly has more than 20 stations of the SITP, where buses transport from there to another place of the city.

The neighbourhood has the Marly station station and the most important system of the city, the Transmilenio.

=== Bus Rapid Transit ===
- A: Marly, Calle 45

==== Marly Main Line Service ====
Service as of April 29, 2006
Type	Northern Routes	Southern Routes
Local	6 / 8	6 / 8
Express Monday through Saturday all day	B14 / C15 / C19 / D21 / B73	F14 / H15 / F19 / H21 / H74
Express Monday through Saturday; Mixed service, rush and non-rush	C17 / B27	H17 / H27
Express Saturday; All Day	C17	H17
Express Sunday and holidays	C91 / B92 / D95	F91 / H92 / J95

==== Calle 45 Main Line Service ====
Service as of April 29, 2006
Type	Northern Routes	Southern Routes
Local	6 / 8	6 / 8
Express Monday through Saturday all day	B14 / C15 / B18 / C19 / D20 / B23	F14 / H15 / L18 / F19 / H20 / K23
Express Monday through Saturday morning rush	D50 / D51	
Express Monday through Saturday evening rush		F62
Express Monday through Saturday; Mixed service, rush and non-rush		H73
Express Sunday and holidays	C91 / B92 / D95	F91 / H92 / J95

=== Bike Paths ===
Route	Road	Description	Length (km)
R18 Tc.	Calle 63	from Carrera 13 to Av. Ciudad de Quito	1.9
R29	Calle 27 Sur	from Carrera Séptima to Carrera 30	3.0

=== Airport ===
Bogotá's main airport, El Dorado International Airport is about 13 km. (8 miles) from Marly.

== Education ==
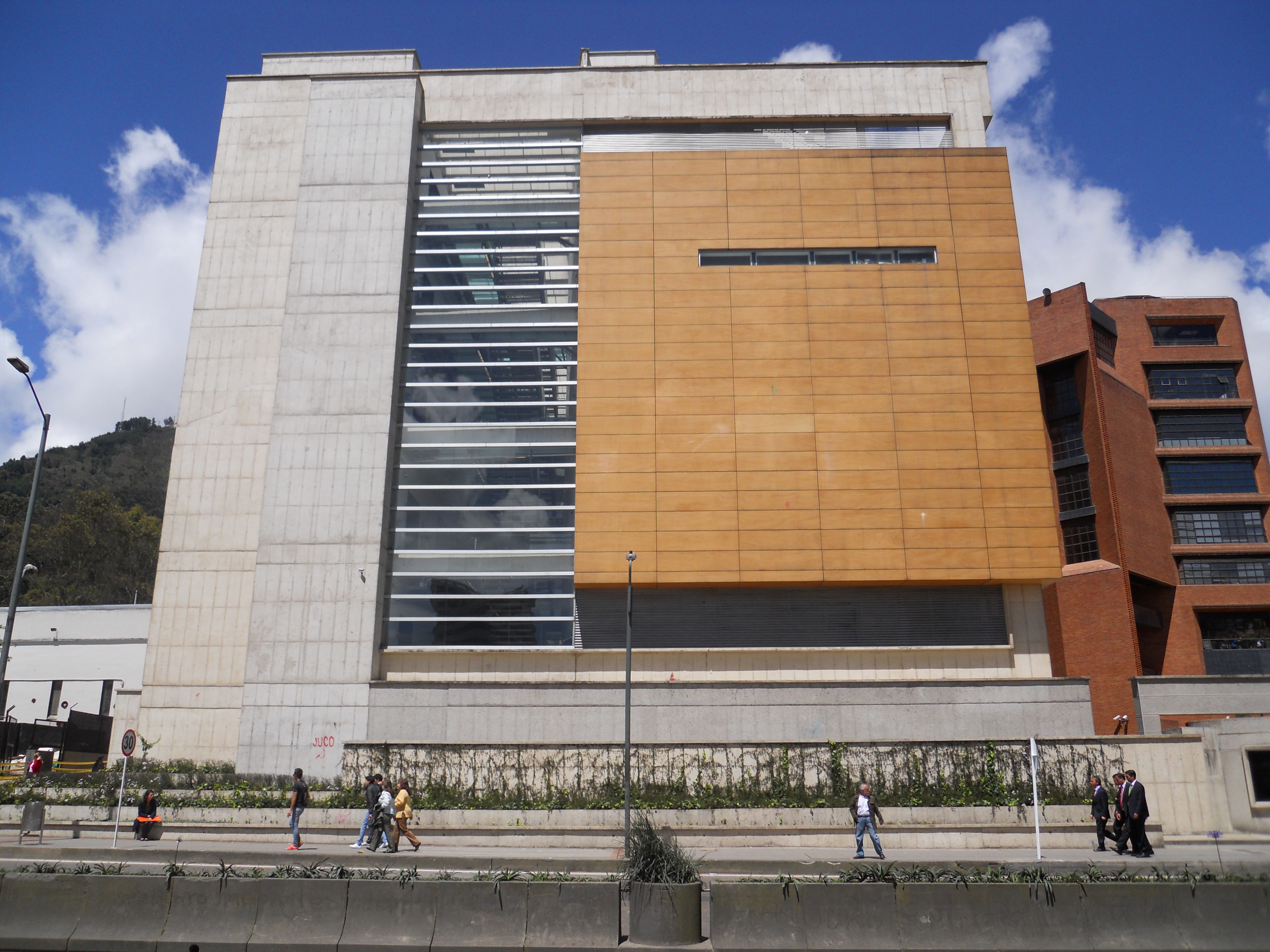
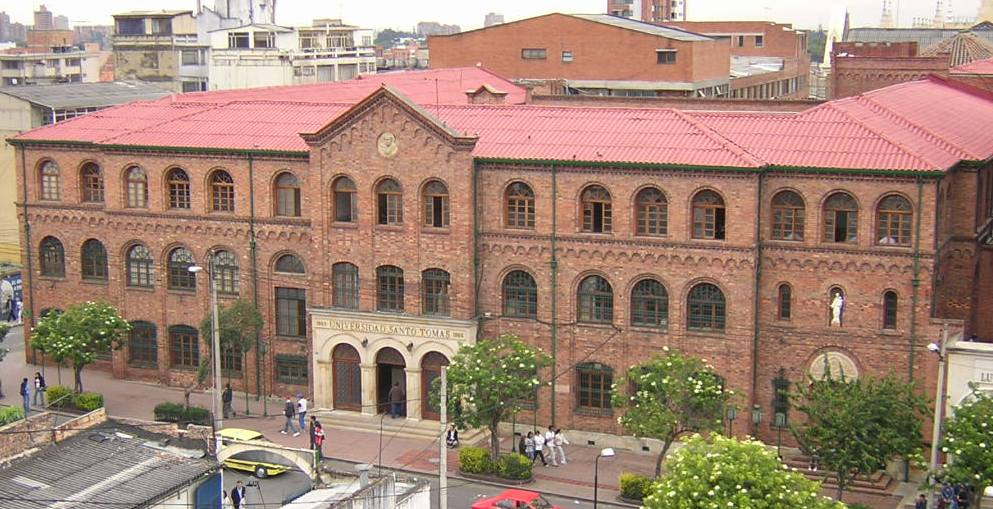
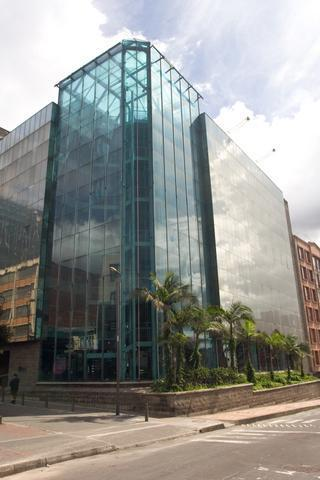
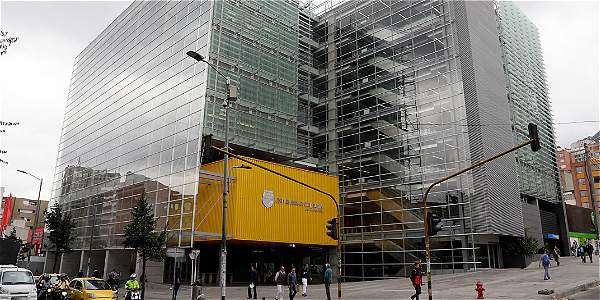
Marly is home to Pontifical Xavierian University, Universidad Santo Tomás, Pilot University of Colombia and Universidad Católica de Colombia.

=== Schools ===
The schools within Marly are:

==== Public ====
- Manuela Beltran Technique School

==== Private ====
- Champagnat School
- Parochial School Our Lady of Chiquinquirá
- Parochial Liceum Zara Zapata
- John Dalton School
- Chapinero's English Royal School
- New Britanial School

==== Kindergartens ====
- El Osito Pelusin Kindergarten
- Picardy Kindergarten
- Jumper Frog Kindergarten
- Bilingual Kindergarten Our Creativity

===== Military Schools =====
====== Private ======
- Antonio Ricaurte Militar Institute

=== Universities ===
==== Private ====
- Universidad Católica de Colombia
- Universidad Santo Tomás
- Pilot University of Colombia
- Pontifical Xavierian University

==== Public ====
- District University of Bogotá; Faculty of Music

== Emergency services ==
=== Police Services ===
The Policia Nacional de Colombia operates the Chapinero area with the Police Station CAI Chapinero, at the Street 60 #9-12 serving the neighborhood.

=== Fire Services ===
The Chapinero's Firehouse is in the area.

== Television, film and entertainment ==
For its location in the City Marly has appeared in several TV shows and films.

Exterior scenes from films such as Mile 22 have been filmed in the area. Several episodes of the television show Distrito Salvaje were filmed in Marly.

The neighborhood also do a Cameo in the Netflix TV Show presented by David Farrier Dark Tourist, on the first episode Latin America

Marly has appeared in some local shows and films, including Nickelodeon series Yo soy Franky.

The neighborhood had a shout-out in the song Bogotá by Mauricio & Palodeagua.
