= Calle 63 (TransMilenio) =

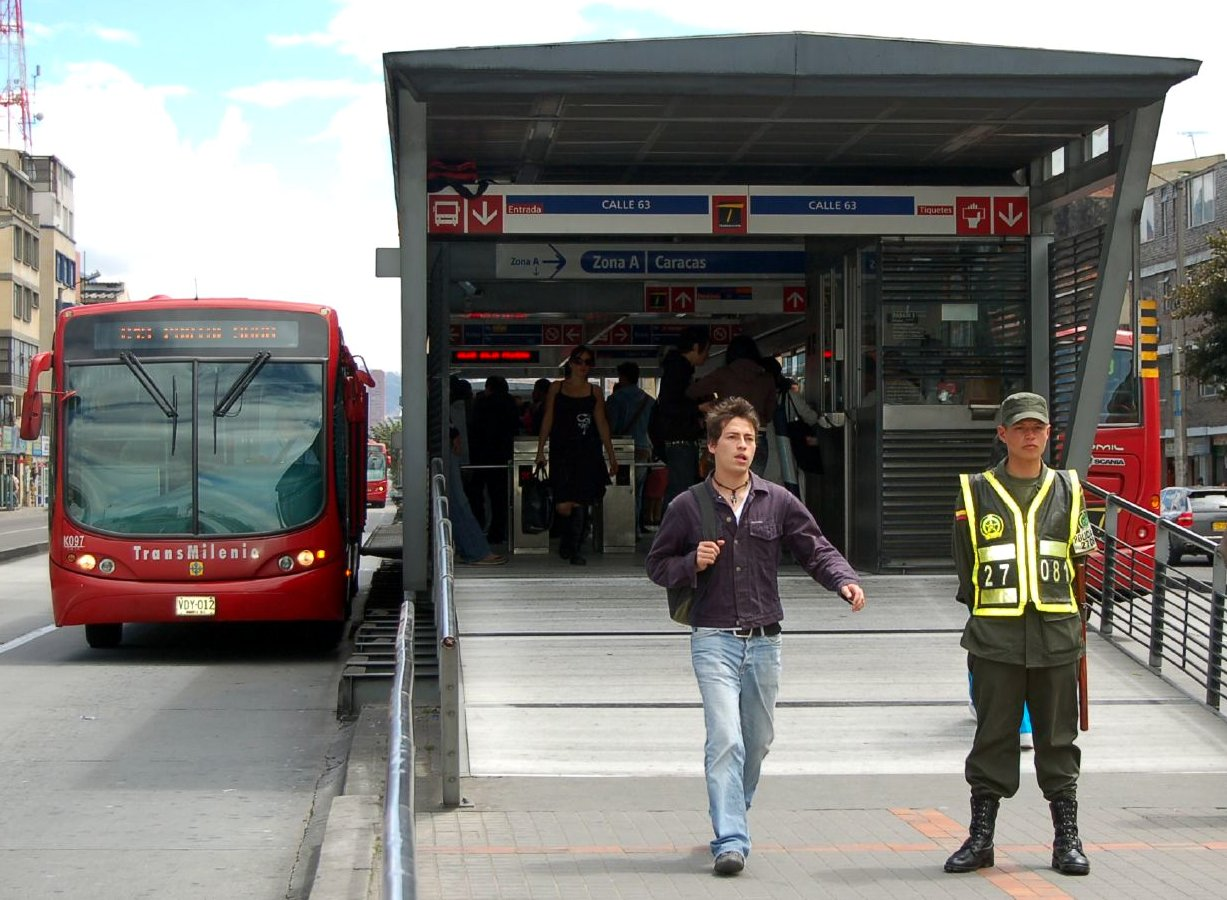

General information
- Location: Avenida Caracas between Calles 60 and 63; Chapinero and Teusaquillo
- Line(s): Caracas
- Platforms: 3

History
- Opened: December 17, 2000

Services
Preceding station	TransMilenio	Following station
Flores towards Calle 76	A	Calle 57 towards Tercer Milenio

The simple-station Calle 63 is part of the TransMilenio mass-transit system of Bogotá, Colombia, opened in the year 2000.

== Location ==
The station is located in northern Bogotá, specifically on Avenida Caracas, between Calles 60 and 63.

== History ==
In 2000, phase one of the TransMilenio system was opened between Portal de la 80 and Tercer Milenio, including this station.

The station is named Calle 63 due to its proximity to the arterial route of the same name.

The simple-station Calle 63 is part of the TransMilenio mass-transit system of Bogotá, Colombia, opened in the year 2000.

It serves the Chapinero, San Luis, and La Esperanza neighborhoods.

The nearest point of interest is the Plaza de Lourdes, about 150 meters from the station.

== Station services ==
=== Old trunk services ===
Services rendered until April 29, 2006
Kind	Routes	Frequency
Current		Every 3 minutes on average
Express	Expreso 20 Expreso 60 Expreso 80 Expreso 90	Every 2 minutes on average
Express Dominical	Expreso Dominical 15 Expreso Dominical 25 Expreso Dominical 35	Every 3 or 4 minutes on average

=== Main Line Service ===
Service as of April 29, 2006
Type	Northern Routes	Southern Routes
Local	6 / 8	6 / 8
Express Every Day all day	C19 / B75	F19 / H75
Express Monday through Saturday all day	B13 / B18 / D21	H13 / L18 / H21
Express Monday through Friday; Mixed service, rush and non-rush	C29	F29

=== Special services ===
Also, the following special route works:

- 18.8 Circular to the neighborhood Bosque Calderón.

=== Inter-city service ===
This station does not have inter-city service.

== See also ==
- List of TransMilenio Stations
