= Planetarium of Bogotá =

Bogotá Planetarium
- Planetario de Bogotá
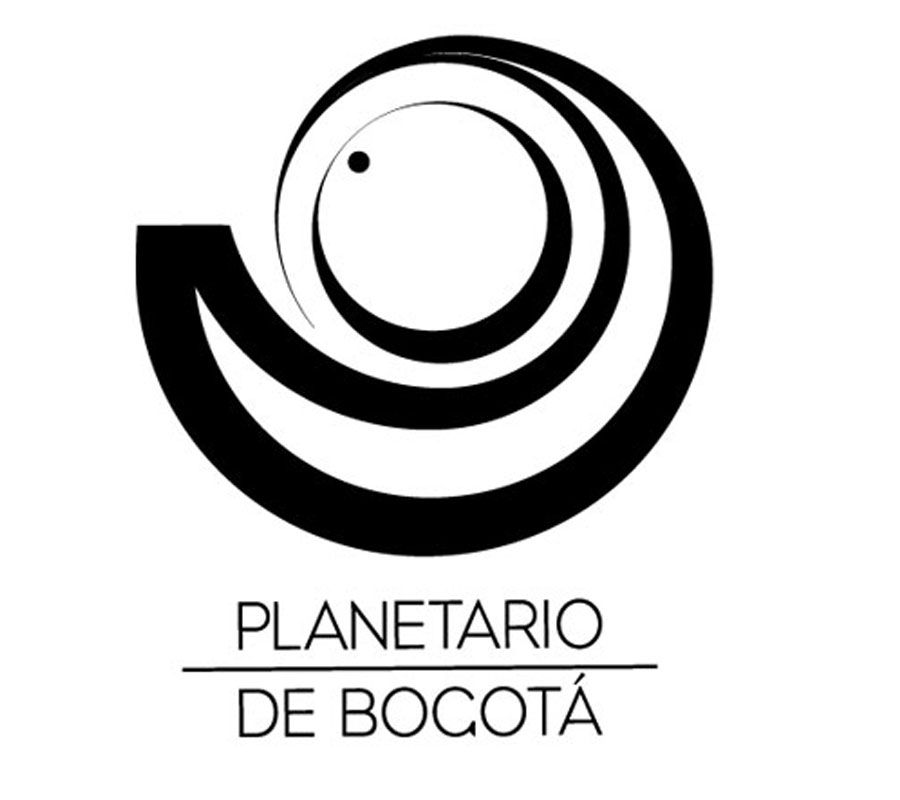

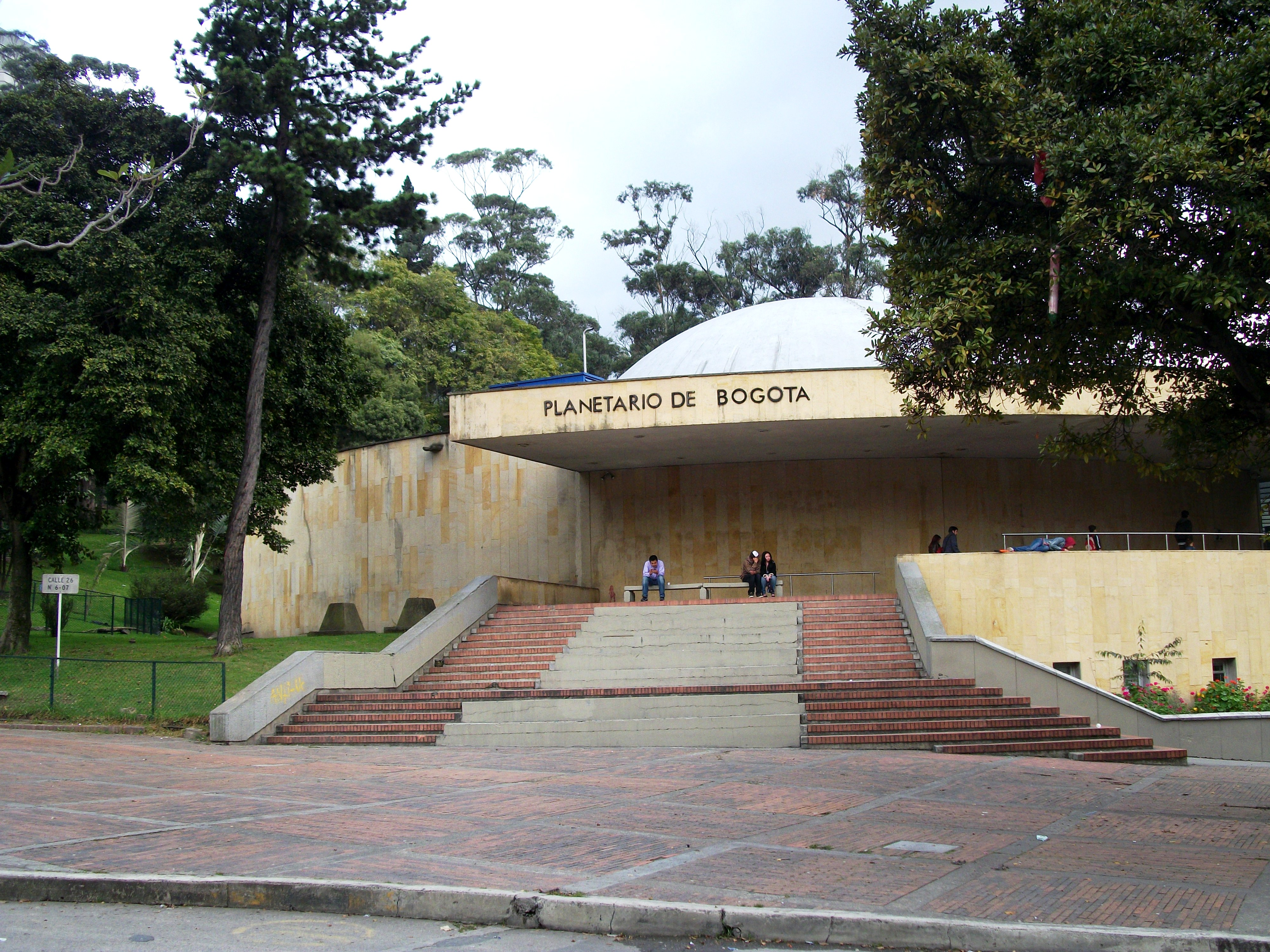
- Established: December 22, 1969; 56 years ago
- Location: Bogotá D.C., Colombia
- Coordinates: 4°36′44″N 74°4′8″W
- Type: Planetarium, Science museum
- Public transit access: National Museum (station); Calle 26
- Website: Planetario de Bogotá

The Planetarium of Bogotá is a cultural center and planetarium located in the International Center of Bogota, Colombia, within Independence Park. Its dome has a 23-metre screen cupola.

== Features ==
The Planetarium was built at the initiative of Mayor Virgilio Barco Vargas in 1967, and officially opened on December 22, 1969. This was the first of a set of nine museums, which operate today as a cultural center in the city. The Planetarium also contains a Space Museum, a Public Library and a Conference Auditorium. The building also housed in the beginning, the Natural Science Museum, the Film District and the Museum of Modern Art.

Since 2003, the planetarium has permanently displayed the Colombia lunar sample displays that were gifted by the United States Federal Government to the People of Colombia.

In 2008, when the city turned 470 years old, the Planetarium bought a new projector. To provide better service to visitors, a public souvenir shop and a modern café were created.

In 2011 began the final stage of planetary remodeling which reinforced the structure, improved signage, renewed dome projection screen, expanded capacity and built the Space Museum, which consists of five interactive rooms.

== Gallery ==
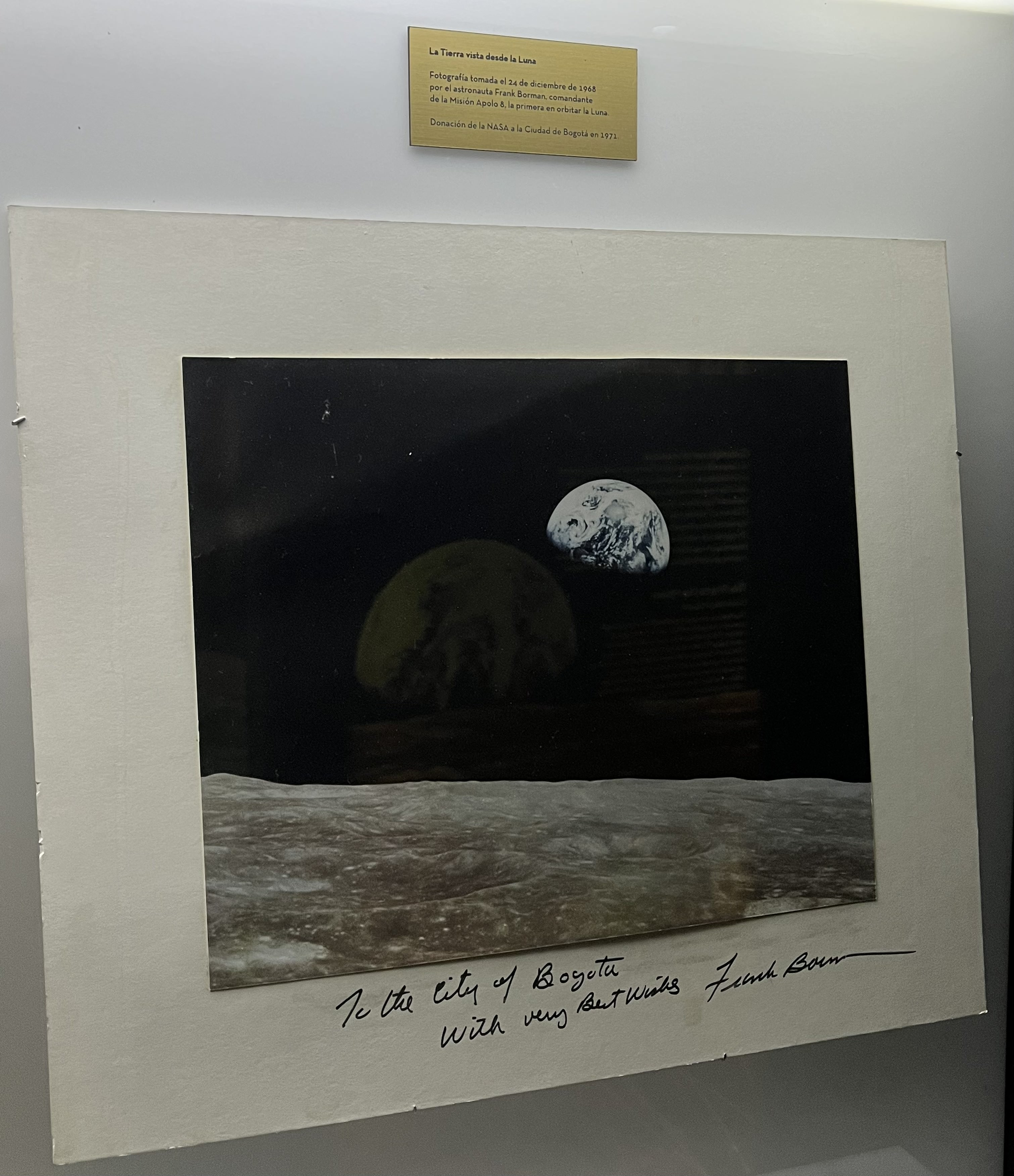
An Earthrise photograph inscribed and signed by Frank Borman

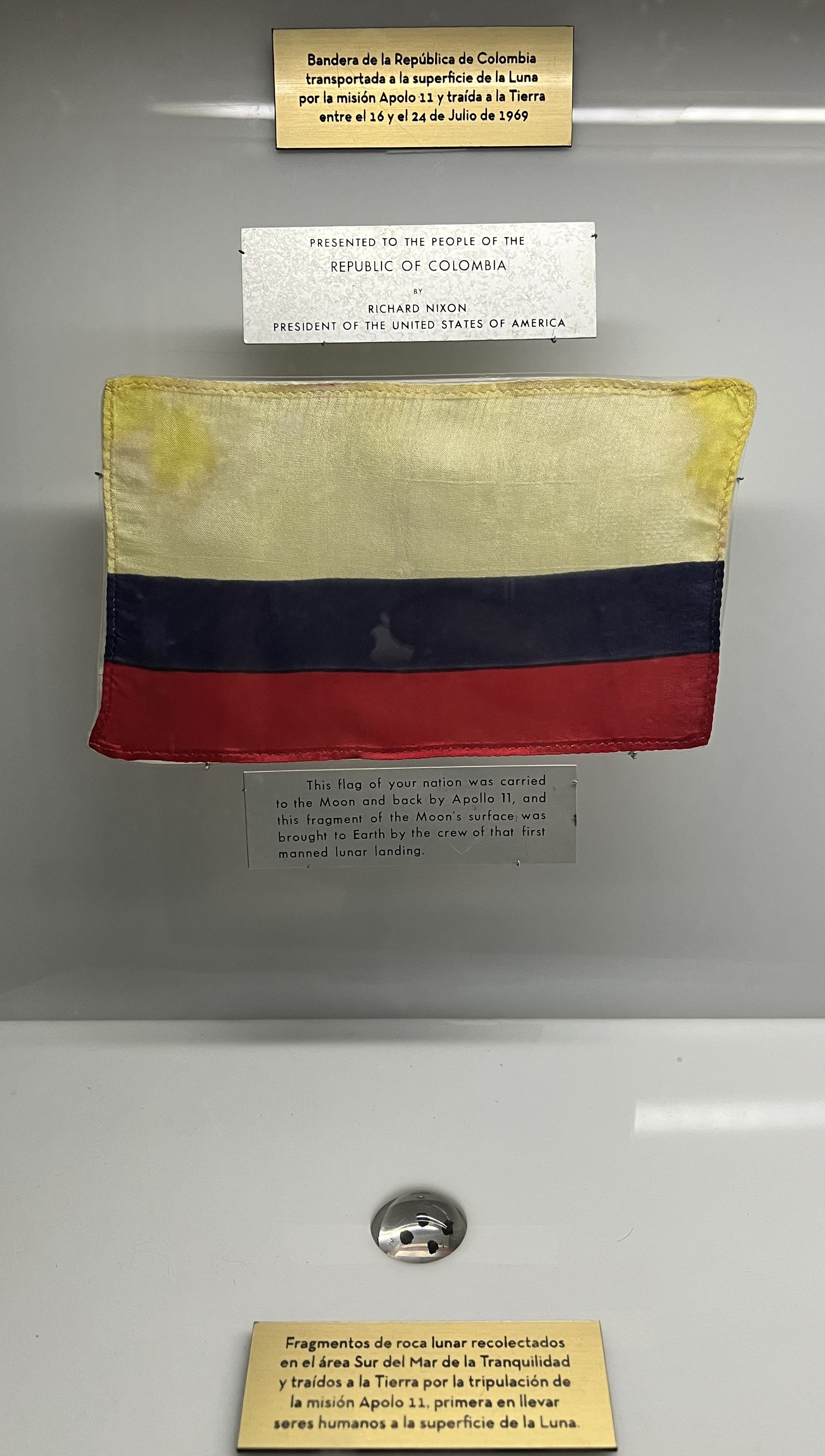
Colombia lunar sample displays from the Apollo 11 mission

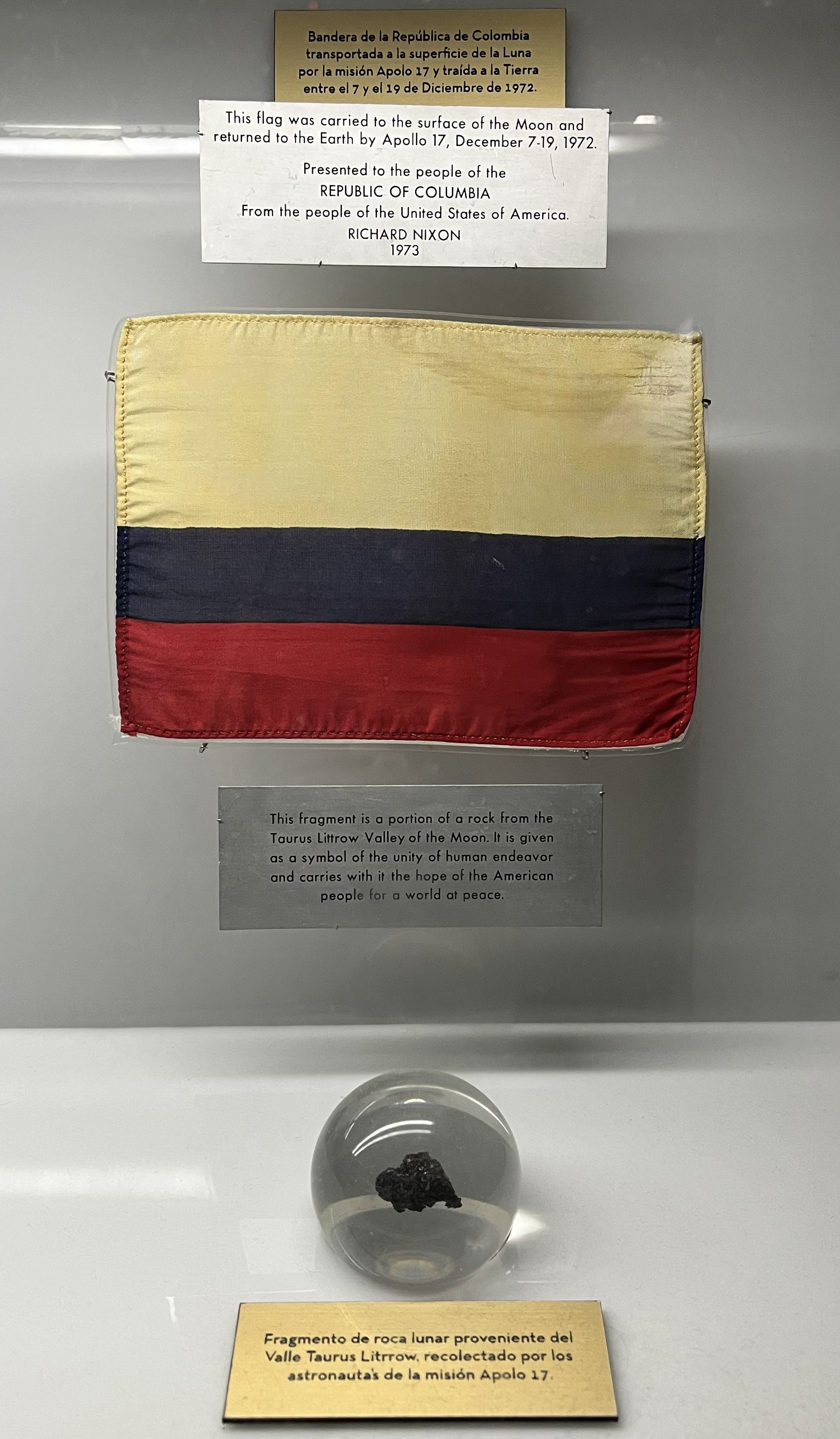
Colombia lunar sample displays from the Apollo 17 mission

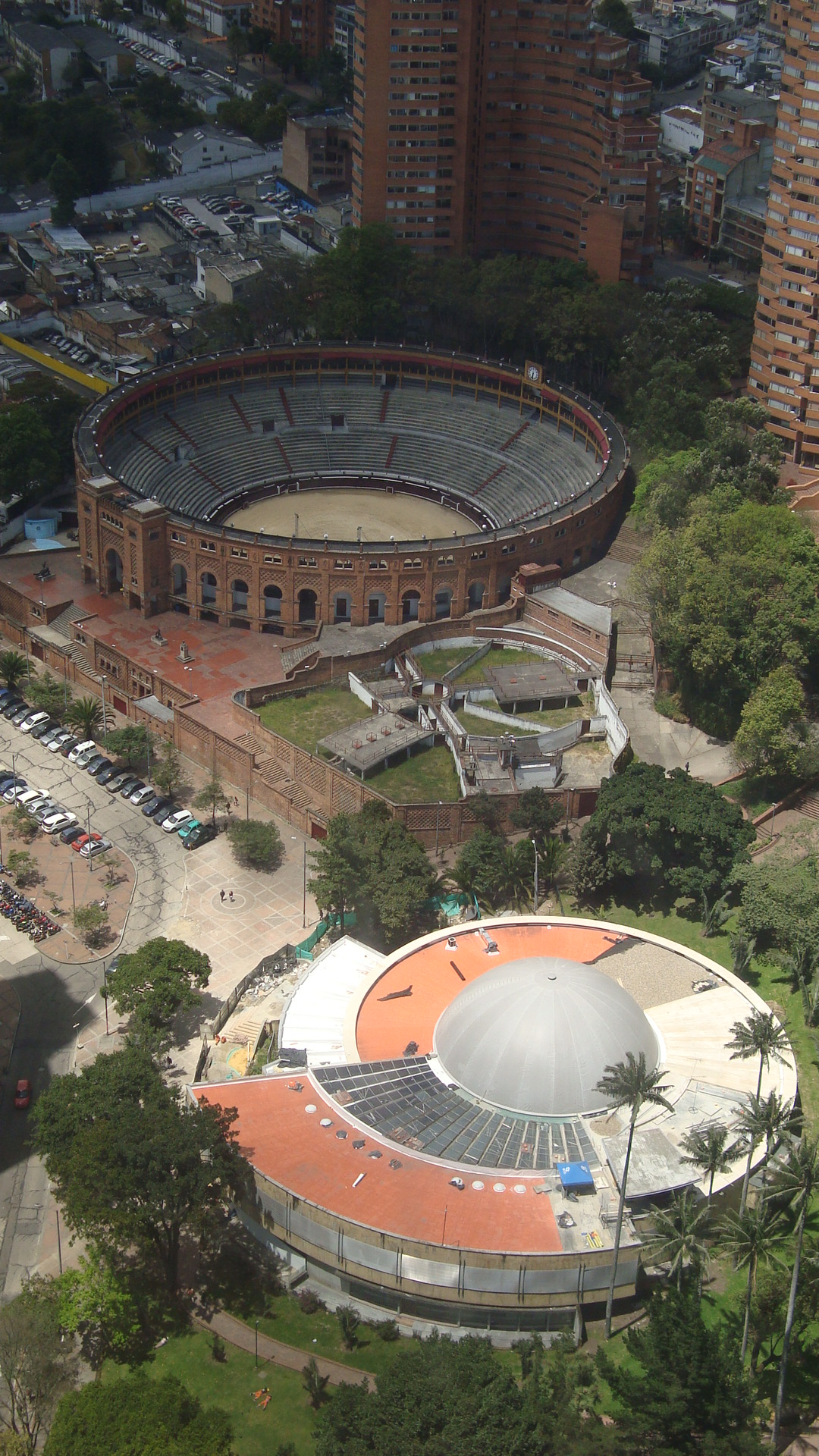
The planetarium building next to the Santamaría Bullring
