= Marly =

Marly may refer to:

== People ==
- Florence Marly (1919–1978), Czech-born French film actress

== Places ==
=== France ===
- Marly, Moselle, in the Moselle département
- Marly, Nord, in the Nord département
- Marly-Gomont, in the Aisne département
- Marly-la-Ville, in the Val-d'Oise département
- Marly-le-Roi, in the Yvelines département
  - Château de Marly, a former royal residence
- Marly-sous-Issy, in the Saône-et-Loire département
- Marly-sur-Arroux, in the Saône-et-Loire département

=== Switzerland ===
- Marly, Fribourg, in the Canton of Fribourg

=== Colombia ===
- Marly, neighbourhood in Bogotá.

- Marly (TransMilenio), a station in the rapid-transit system of Bogotá

== Things ==
- Machine de Marly, 1684 hydraulic system in Yvelines, France

== See also ==
- Marl (disambiguation)
- Marley (disambiguation)
