= Calle 34 (TransMilenio) =

Transit station in Bogota, Colombia

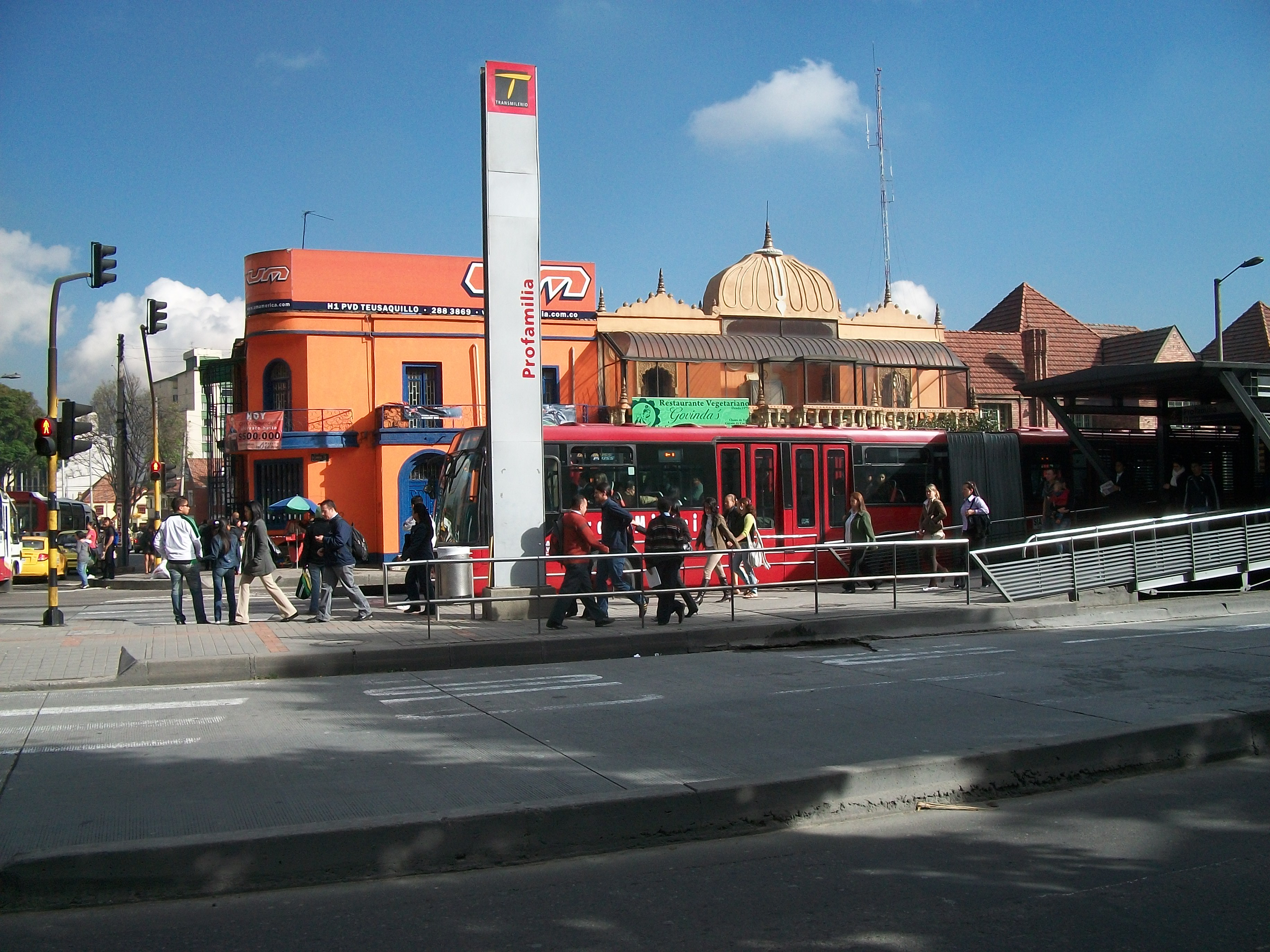

General information
- Location: Avenida Caracas between Calles 32 and 34. Santa Fé and Teusaquillo
- Line(s): Caracas
- Platforms: 3

History
- Opened: December 17, 2017

Services
Preceding station	TransMilenio	Following station
Avenida 39 towards Calle 76	A	Calle 26 towards Tercer Milenio

The simple-station Calle 34 is part of the TransMilenio mass-transit system of Bogotá, Colombia, opened in the year 2000.

== Location ==
The station is located close to downtown Bogotá, specifically on Avenida Caracas between Calles 32 and 34.

== History ==
In 2000, phase one of the TransMilenio system was opened between Portal de la 80 and Tercer Milenio, including this station.

The station serves the Teusaquillo, Samper, and Sagrado Corazón neighborhoods.

As of March 2019 changed the name of Calle 34 to the current name.

== Station services ==
=== Old trunk services ===
Services rendered until April 29, 2006
Kind	Routes	Frequency
Current		Every 3 minutes on average
Express	Expreso 10 Expreso 100	Every 2 minutes on average
Super Express	Expreso 200 Expreso 201	Every 2 minutes on average

=== Main line service ===
Service as of April 29, 2006
Type	Northern Routes	Southern Routes
Local	6 / 8	6 / 8
Express Monday through Saturday; All day	B14 / B18 / C19 / D20	F14 / L18 / F19 / H20
Express Monday through Saturday; Morning rush	D50 / D51	
Express Monday through Saturday; Evening rush		F62
Express Monday through Friday; Mixed service, rush and non-rush	C29	F29 / H73
Express Sundays and holidays	D95	J95

=== Feeder routes ===
This station does not have connections to feeder routes.

=== Inter-city service ===
This station does not have inter-city service.

== See also ==
- List of TransMilenio Stations
