= Markley =

Markley may refer to:

People:

- Alfred C. Markley (1843–1926), American Brigadier General
- Benjamin Markley Boyer (1823–1887), Democratic member of the U.S. House of Representatives from Pennsylvania
- Bob Markley (1935–2003), American singer-songwriter and record producer who co-founded The West Coast Pop Art Experimental Band
- Linn Markley Farish (1901–1944), American rugby union player and spy
- Philip Swenk Markley (1789–1834), member of the U.S. House of Representatives from Pennsylvania
- Stephen Markley, American journalist and author
- Helen Markley Miller (1896–1984), American writer of historical and biographical fiction for children

Places:

- Markley, Texas, unincorporated community in Young County, Texas, United States
- Markley Lake or Scott County, Minnesota, county located in the U.S. state of Minnesota
- Mary Markley Hall (Markley) is a residence hall operated by the University of Michigan University Housing in Ann Arbor

Music:

- Old Man Markley, punk & bluegrass band based out of Los Angeles, CA
- Dean Markley USA, company that manufactures musical instrument related products, primarily guitar strings
- Markley A Group, a band

Businesses:

- Markley, LLC, business based in Boston, MA primarily known for data center, real estate and technology services

== See also ==
- Arkley
- Markey (disambiguation)
- Markle (disambiguation)
- Marly (disambiguation)
