= Calle 19 (TransMilenio) =

Bus station in Bogotá, Colombia

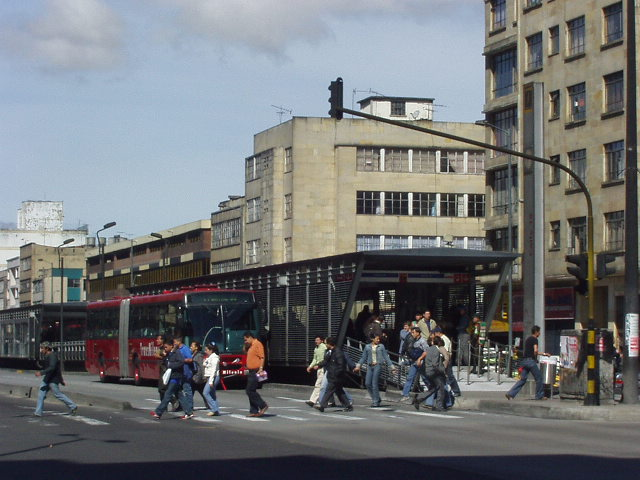

General information
- Location: Avenida Caracas between Calles 19 and 17. Santa Fe and Los Mártires
- Line(s): Caracas
- Platforms: 3

History
- Opened: December 17, 2017

Services
| Preceding station | TransMilenio | Following station |
|---|---|---|
| Calle 22 towards Calle 76 | A | Avenida Jiménez towards Tercer Milenio |

The simple-station Calle 19 is part of the TransMilenio mass-transit system of Bogotá, Colombia, opened in the year 2000.

== Location ==
The station is located in the heart of the city, specifically Avenida Caracas between Calles 17 and 19.

== History ==
In the year 2000, phase one of the TransMilenio system was opened between Portal de la 80 and Tercer Milenio, including this station.

The station gets the name Calle 19 due to its proximity to that street.

The station serves the La Capuchina, La Favorita, and Alameda neighborhoods.

Four months after the opening of the TransMilenio, during the national strike of April 9, 2001, the first attacks against the system occurred. The stations Calle 22 and Calle 19 were destroyed by stones, and some passengers suffered light wounds.

== Station Services ==
=== Old trunk services ===
Services rendered until April 29, 2006
| Kind | Routes | Frequency |
|---|---|---|
| Current | 2 Portal Norte 3 Portal Norte | Every 3 minutes on average |
| Express | Expreso 30 Expreso 40 Expreso 50 Expreso 70 Expreso 80 | Every 2 minutes on average |
| Express Dominical | Expreso Dominical 15 Expreso Dominical 25 Expreso Dominical 35 | Every 3 or 4 minutes on average |

=== Main Line Service ===
Service as of April 29, 2006
| Type | Northern Routes | Southern Routes |
|---|---|---|
| Local | 3 / 5 / 8 | 3 / 5 / 8 |
| Express Monday through Saturday; All Day | C15 / C19 / D20 | H15 / F19 / H20 |
| Express Monday through Saturday; Early Morning | D51 | |
| Express Monday through Saturday; Off-peak | B74 | J72 / H73 |
| Express Sundays and holidays | C91 / B92 / B93 | F91 / H92 / H93 |

=== Feeder routes ===
This station does not have connections to feeder routes.

=== Inter-city service ===
This station does not have inter-city service.

== See also ==
- Bogotá
- TransMilenio
- List of TransMilenio Stations
