= Calle 57 (TransMilenio) =

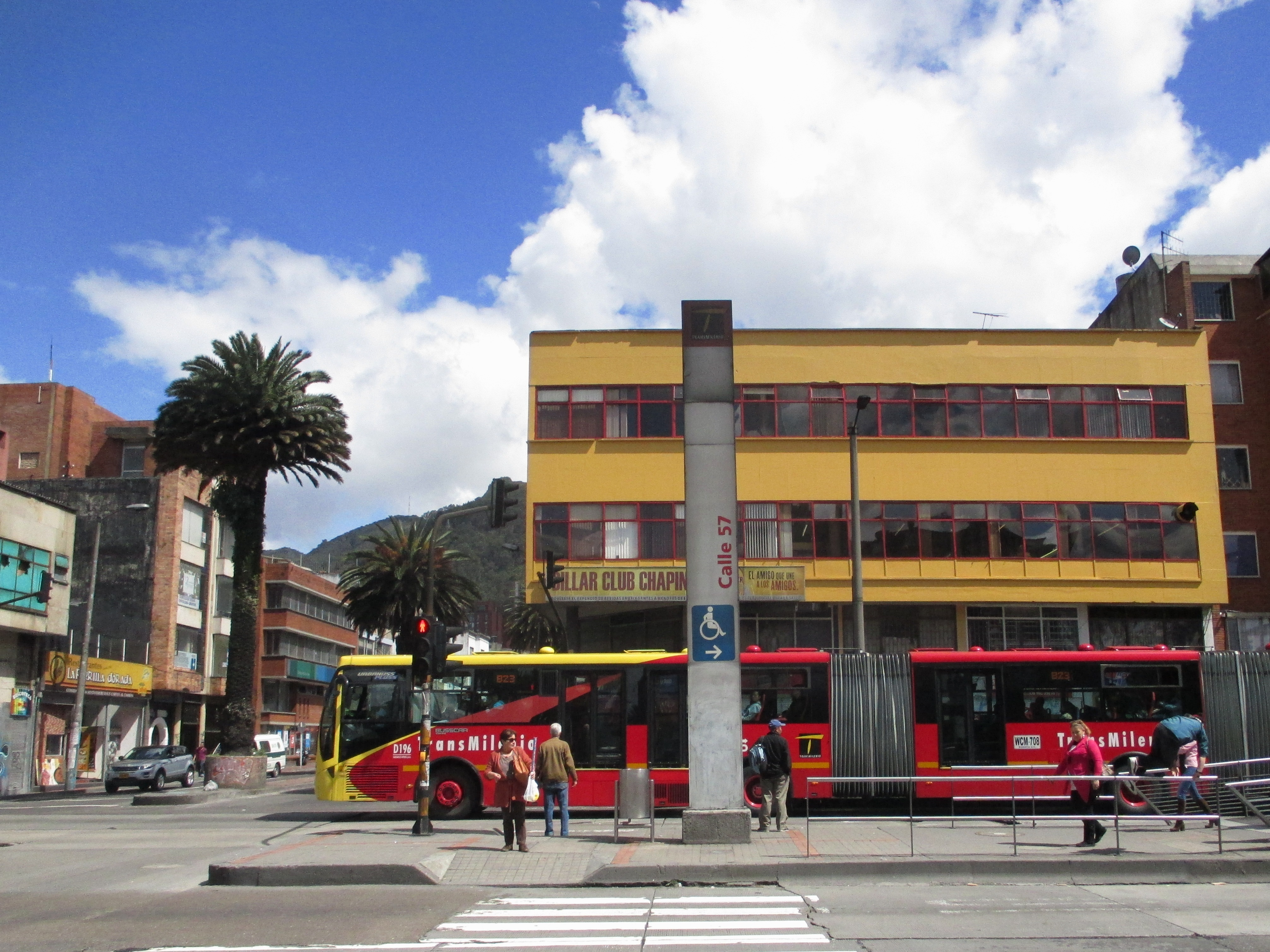

General information
- Location: Avenida Caracas between Calles 54A and 57; Chapinero and Teusaquillo
- Line: Caracas
- Platforms: 3

History
- Opened: December 17, 2017

Services
Preceding station	TransMilenio	Following station
Calle 63 towards Calle 76	A	Marly towards Tercer Milenio
Location

The simple-station Calle 57 is part of the TransMilenio mass-transit system of Bogotá, Colombia, opened in the year 2000.

== Location ==
The station is located in northern Bogotá, specifically on Avenida Caracas, between Calles 54A and 57.

== History ==
In 2000, phase one of the TransMilenio system was opened between Portal de la 80 and Tercer Milenio, including this station.

The station is named Calle 57 due to its proximity to that arterial route. It serves the San Luis and Chapinero neighborhoods.

It also serves passengers for the nearby destinations of the El Campín stadium and the Teatro Santa Fe.

== Station Services ==
=== Old trunk services ===
Services rendered until April 29, 2006
Kind	Routes	Frequency
Current		Every 3 minutes on average
Express	Expreso 20 Expreso 40 Expreso 60 Expreso 90	Every 2 minutes on average
Super Express	Expreso 200 Expreso 201	Every 2 minutes on average
Express Dominical	Expreso Dominical 15	Every 3 or 4 minutes on average

=== Main Line Service ===
Service as of April 29, 2006
Type	Northern Routes	Southern Routes
Local	6 / 8	6 / 8
Express Monday through Saturday all day	B18 / D21 / B23 / D70	L18 / H21 / K23 / J24
Express Monday through Friday; Morning rush	D50	H51
Express Monday through Friday; Evening rush		F62
Express Monday through Saturday; Morning and Evening rush	B74	J72
Express Monday through Friday; Mixed service, rush and non-rush	C17	H17
Express Saturday; All day	C17	H17

=== Special services ===
Also, since March 9 of 2013 the following special route works:

- 18.12 Circular to the neighborhood El Paraíso.

=== Inter-city service ===
This station does not have inter-city service.

== See also ==
- Bogotá
- TransMilenio
- List of TransMilenio Stations
