= Calle 22 (TransMilenio) =

Bus stop in Bogotá, Colombia

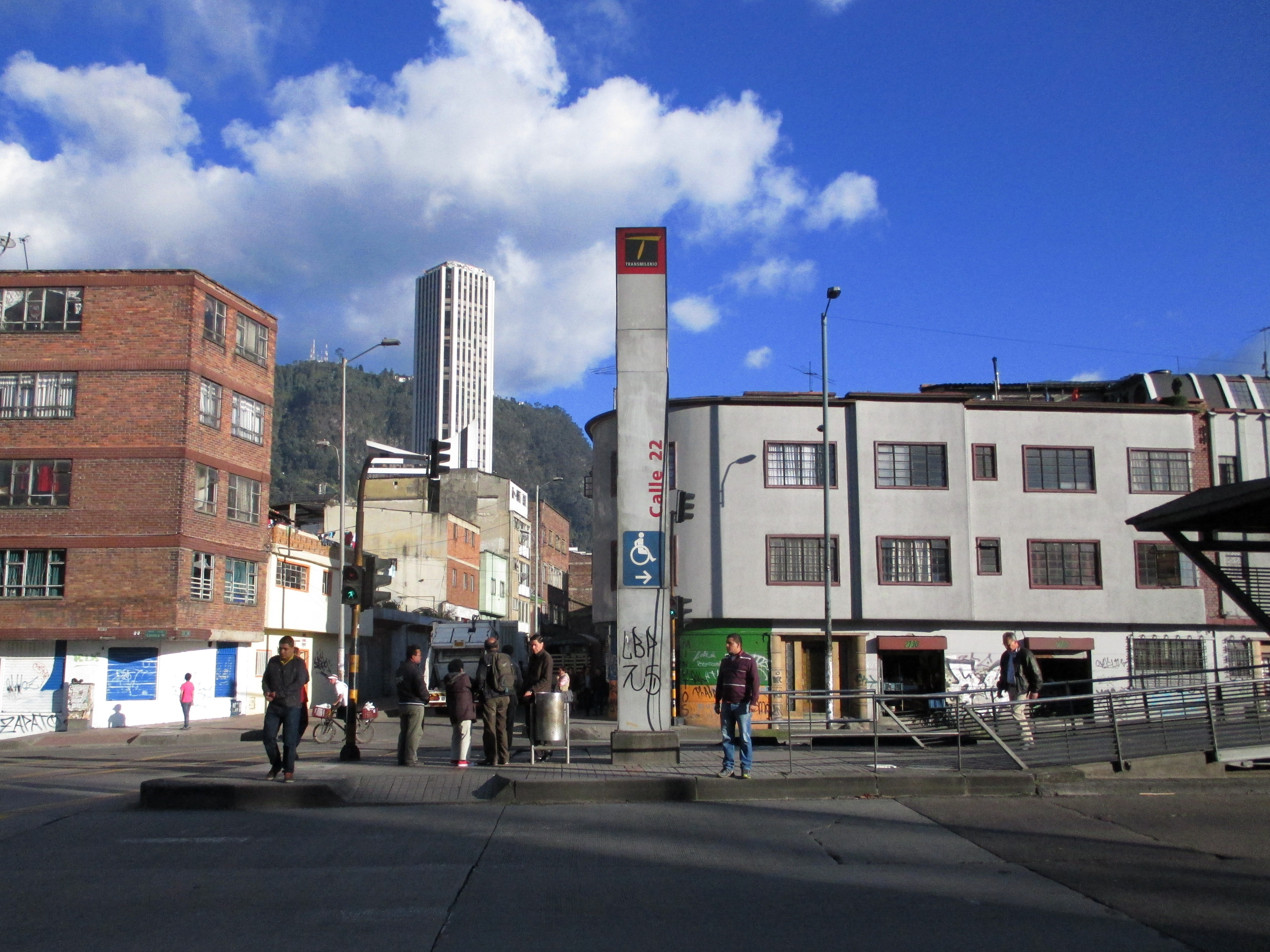

General information
- Location: Avenida Caracas between Calles 22 and 24. Santa Fe and Los Mártires
- Line(s): Caracas
- Platforms: 3

History
- Opened: December 17, 2000

Services
Preceding station	TransMilenio	Following station
Calle 26 towards Calle 76	A	Calle 19 towards Tercer Milenio

The simple-station Calle 22 is part of the TransMilenio mass-transit system of Bogotá, Colombia, opened in the year 2000.

== Location ==
The station is located in the heart of downtown Bogotá, specifically on Avenida Caracas between Calles 22 and 24.

== History ==
In 2000, phase one of the TransMilenio system was opened between Portal de la 80 and Tercer Milenio, including this station.

The station is named Calle 22 due to its proximity to that street. It services the demand of the passengers of downtown Bogotá, specifically the neighborhoods of Santa Fé and Alameda.

Four months after the opening of the TransMilenio, during the national strike of April 9, 2001, the first attacks against the system occurred. The stations Calle 19 and Calle 22 were destroyed by stones, and some passengers suffered light wounds.

== Station Services ==
=== Old trunk services ===
Services rendered until April 29, 2006
Kind	Routes	Frequency
Current	2 Portal Norte 3 Portal Norte	Every 3 minutes on average
Express	Expreso 10 Expreso 60 Expreso 70 Expreso 80	Every 2 minutes on average
Express Dominical	Expreso Dominical 25 Expreso Dominical 35	Every 3 or 4 minutes on average

=== Main Line Service ===
Service as of April 29, 2006
Type	Northern Routes	Southern Routes
Local	3 / 8	3 / 8
Express Monday through Saturday; All Day	K10 / B13 / C15	L10 / H13 / H15
Express Sundays and holidays	B93 / K97	H93 / L97
Routes starting and ending the travel in this station
Type	Northern Routes	Southern Routes
Local	5	5

=== Feeder routes ===
This station does not have connections to feeder routes.

=== Inter-city service ===
This station does not have inter-city service.

== See also ==
- Bogotá
- TransMilenio
- List of TransMilenio Stations
