= Avenida 39 (TransMilenio) =

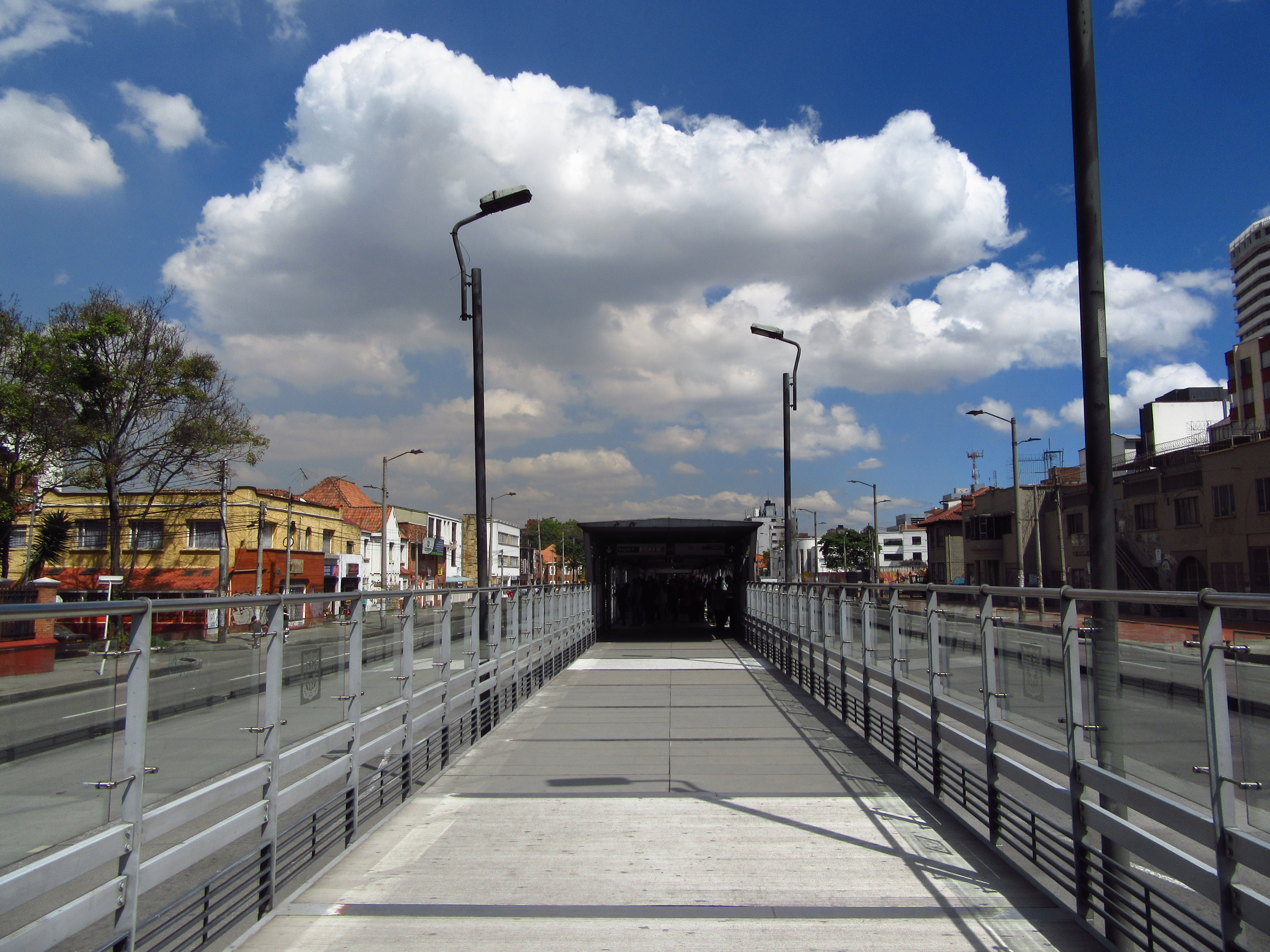

General information
- Location: Avenida Caracas between Avenida 39 and Calle 37. Santa Fé and Teusaquillo
- Line(s): Caracas
- Platforms: 3

History
- Opened: December 17, 2017

Services
Preceding station	TransMilenio	Following station
Calle 45 towards Calle 76	A	Calle 34 towards Tercer Milenio

The simple-station Avenida 39 is part of the TransMilenio mass-transit system of Bogotá, Colombia, opened in the year 2000.

== Location ==
The station is located north of downtown Bogotá, specifically on Avenida Caracas between Calles 39 and 37.

== History ==
In 2000, phase one of the TransMilenio system was opened between Portal de la 80 and Tercer Milenio, including this station.

The station is named Avenida 39 due to its proximity to that arterial route.

The service also covers the demand of the Universidad Javeriana and the passengers of the La Magdalena, Teusaquillo, Sucre, Sagrado Corazón, and Parque Nacional neighborhoods.

On March 9, 2012, protests lodged by mostly young children in groups of up to 200, blocked in several times and up to 3 hours in the trunk stations Caracas. The protests left destroyed and sacked this season of the system.

== Station services ==
=== Old trunk services ===
Services rendered until April 29, 2006
Kind	Routes	Frequency
Current		Every 3 minutes on average
Express	Expreso 10 Expreso 20 Expreso 40 Expreso 60 Expreso 90	Every 2 minutes on average
Super Express	Expreso 300 Expreso 301	Every 2 minutes on average
Express Dominical	Expreso 15	Every 2 minutes on average

=== Main line service ===
Service as of April 29, 2006
Type	Northern Routes	Southern Routes
Local	6 / 8	6 / 8
Express Monday through Saturday; All day	B13 / C15 / D21 / D70	H13 / H15 / H21 / J24
Express Monday through Saturday; Morning rush	D51 / B52	
Express Monday through Saturday; Evening rush		F62
Express Monday through Saturday; Morning and Evening Rush	B74	J72
Express Monday to Friday; Valley and Peak Time.		H73

=== Feeder routes ===
This station does not have connections to feeder routes.

=== Inter-city service ===
This station does not have inter-city service.

== See also ==
- Bogotá
- TransMilenio
- List of TransMilenio Stations
