= Flores (TransMilenio) =

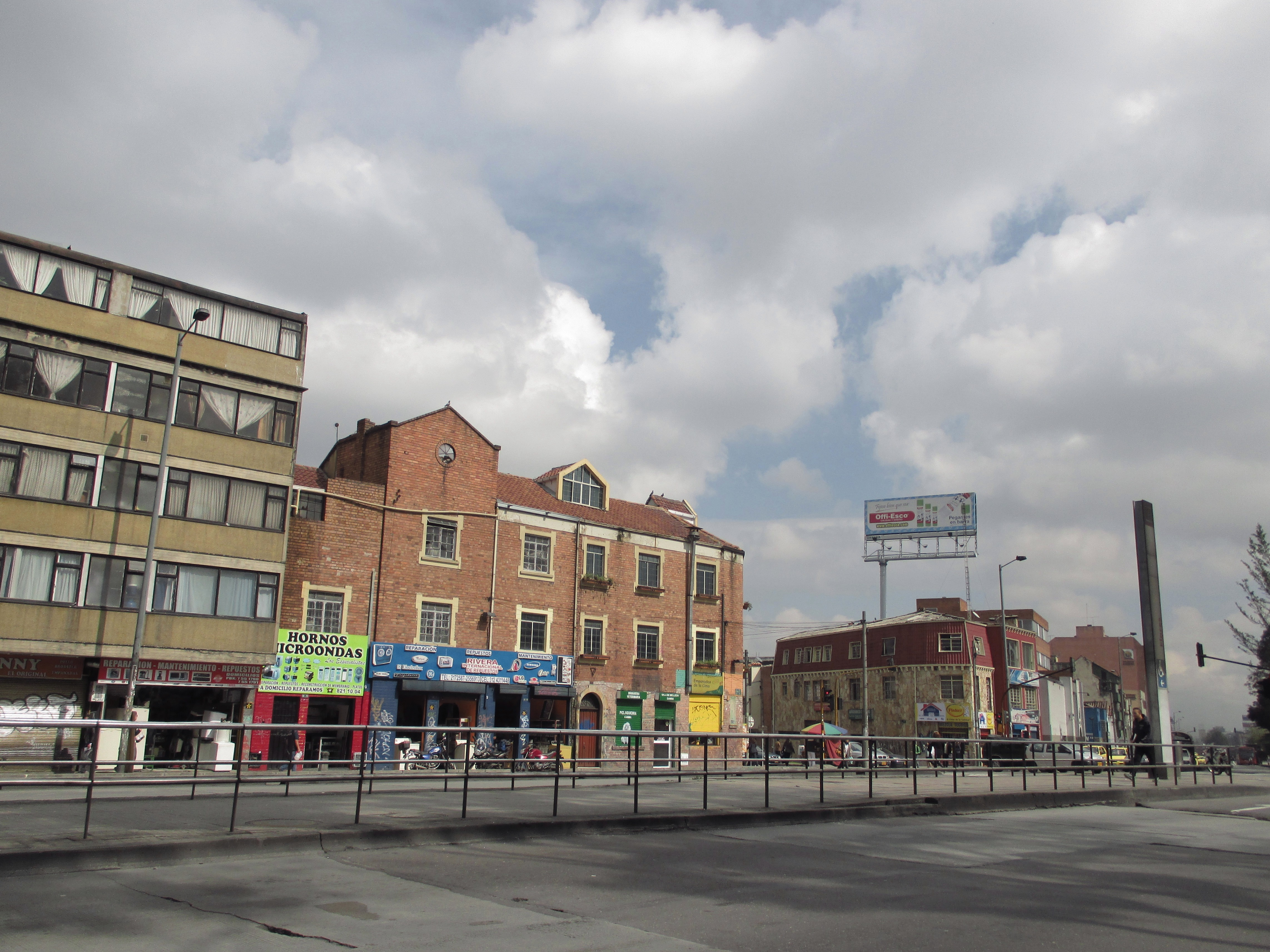

General information
- Location: Chapinero and Barrios Unidos; Colombia

History
- Opened: 2000

Services
Preceding station	TransMilenio	Following station
Calle 72 towards Calle 76	A	Calle 63 towards Tercer Milenio
Location

The simple-station Flores is part of the TransMilenio mass-transit system of Bogotá, Colombia, opened in the year 2000.

== Location ==
The station is located in northern Bogotá, specifically Avenida Caracas, between Calles 67 and 69.

== History ==
In 2000, phase one of the TransMilenio system was opened between Portal de la 80 and Tercer Milenio, including this station. The station is named Flores due to its proximity to the flower market named Plaza las Flores, which is located on the east side of the station. It serves the Chapinero, La Concepción, and La Esperanza neighborhoods.

== Station Services ==
=== Old trunk services ===
Services rendered until April 29, 2006
Kind	Routes	Frequency
Current		Every 3 minutes on average
Express	Expreso 30	Every 2 minutes on average
Super Express	Expreso 200 Expreso 201 Expreso 300 Expreso 301	Every 2 minutes on average
Express Dominical	Expreso Dominical 35	Every 3 or 4 minutes on average

=== Main Line Service ===
Service as of April 29, 2006
Type	Northern Routes	Southern Routes	Frequency
Local	6 / 8	6 / 8	Every three minutes
Express Monday through Saturday all day	B13 / D21	H13 / H21	Every two minutes
Express Monday through Friday; Morning rush	A52		Every two minutes
Express Monday through Friday; Evening rush		G52	Every two minutes
Express Monday through Friday; Mixed service, rush and non-rush	C17	H17	Every two minutes
Express Saturday all day	C17	H17	Every two minutes
Express Sunday and holidays	C91 / B93	F91 / H93	Every 3–4 minutes

=== Feeder routes ===
This station does not have connections to feeder routes.

=== Inter-city service ===
This station does not have inter-city service.

== See also ==
- Bogotá
- TransMilenio
- List of TransMilenio Stations
