= Calle 72 (TransMilenio) =

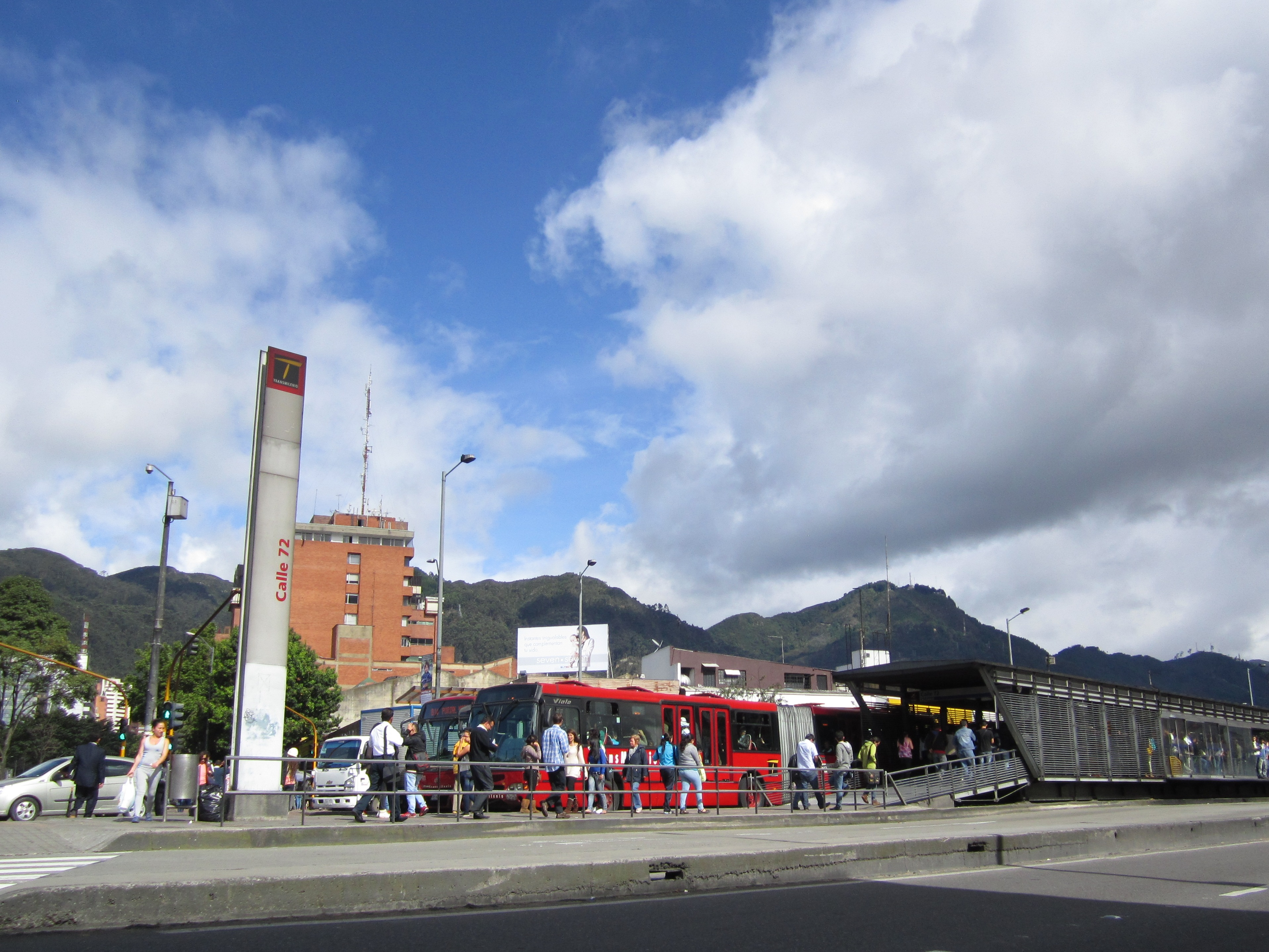

General information
- Location: Chapinero and Barrios Unidos; Colombia

History
- Opened: 2000
- Closed: July 13th, 2024

Services
| Preceding station | TransMilenio | Following station |
|---|---|---|
| Calle 76 Terminus | A | Flores towards Tercer Milenio |

The simple-station Calle 72 was part of the TransMilenio mass-transit system of Bogotá, Colombia, opened in the year 2000.

== Location ==
The station was located in northern Bogotá, specifically on Avenida Caracas, between Calles 70A and 72.

== History ==
In 2000, phase one of the TransMilenio system was opened between Portal de la 80 and Tercer Milenio, including this station.

The station is named Calle 72 due to its proximity to the arterial route of the same name.

It serves the demand of the financial district of Calle 72, whose most important building is the Centro Comercial Avenida Chile which is located approximately 350 meters from the station (a Tourist Assistance booth is located at the mall). It also serves the Quinta Camacho, Porciúncula, La Concepción Norte and San Felipe neighborhoods.

On March 9, 2012, protests lodged by mostly young children in groups of up to 200, blocked in several times and up to 3 hours in the trunk stations Caracas. The protests left destroyed and sacked this season of the system.

On July, due to interventions in the construction of the Metro de Bogotá this station had closed.

== Station Services ==
=== Old trunk services ===
Services rendered until April 29, 2006
| Kind | Routes | Frequency |
|---|---|---|
| Current | | Every 3 minutes on average |
| Express | Expreso 20 Expreso 30 Expreso 50 Expreso 80 | Every 2 minutes on average |
| Express Dominical | Expreso Dominical 15 Expreso Dominical 25 | Every 3 or 4 minutes on average |

=== Main Line Service ===
Service as of April 29, 2006
| Type | Northern Routes | Southern Routes | Frequency |
|---|---|---|---|
| Local | 6 / 8 | 6 / 8 | Every three minutes |
| Express Monday through Saturday all day | C19 / D21 / B73 | F19 / H21 / H74 | Every two minutes |
| Express Monday through Saturday morning rush | D50 | H51 / A52 / A74 | Every two minutes |
| Express Monday through Saturday evening rush | | G52 / F62 | Every two minutes |
| Express Monday through Saturday; Mixed service, rush and non-rush | B27 / C29 | H27 / F29 | Every two minutes |
| Express Monday through Saturday; Morning and Evening rush | B74 | J72 | Every two minutes |
| Express Monday through Friday; Mixed service, rush and non-rush | C17 | H17 | Every two minutes |
| Express Saturday; All Day | C17 | H17 | Every two minutes |
| Express Sunday and holidays | C91 / B92 / D95 | F91 / H92 / J95 | Every 3–4 minutes |

=== Feeder routes ===
This station does not have connections to feeder routes.

=== Inter-city service ===
This station does not have inter-city service.

== See also ==
- Bogotá
- TransMilenio
- List of TransMilenio Stations
