= Marly (TransMilenio) =

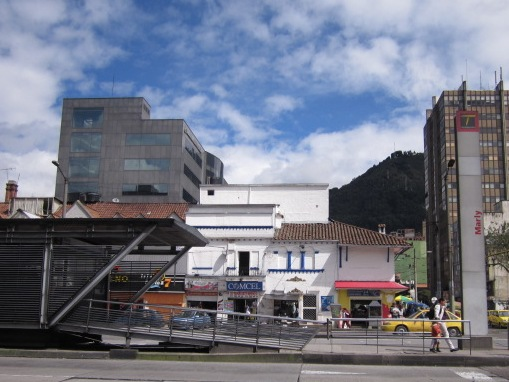

General information
- Location: Avenida Caracas between Calles 49 and 51; Chapinero and Teusaquillo
- Line(s): Caracas
- Platforms: 3

History
- Opened: December 17, 2017

Services
Preceding station	TransMilenio	Following station
Calle 57 towards Calle 76	A	Calle 45 towards Tercer Milenio

The simple-station Marly is part of the TransMilenio mass-transit system of Bogotá, Colombia, opened in the year 2000, serves the neighborhood of Marly, Bogotá

== Location ==
The station is located in northern Bogotá, specifically on Avenida Caracas, between Calles 49 and 51.

== History ==
In 2000, phase one of the TransMilenio system was opened between Portal de la 80 and Tercer Milenio, including this station.

The station is named Marly due to its proximity to the Clinica de Marly, located in Chapinero. It serves the neighborhoods of the Quesada and Marly neighborhoods.

On March 9, 2012, protests lodged by mostly young children in groups of up to 200, blocked in several times and up to 3 hours in the trunk stations Caracas. The protests left destroyed and sacked this season of the system.

== Station Services ==
=== Old trunk services ===
Services rendered until April 29, 2006
Kind	Routes	Frequency
Current		Every 3 minutes on average
Express	Expreso 20 Expreso 40 Expreso 60 Expreso 90 Expreso 100	Every 2 minutes on average
Super Express	Expreso 200 Expreso 201 Expreso 300 Expreso 301	Every 2 minutes on average
Express Dominical	Expreso Dominical 25	Every 3 or 4 minutes on average

=== Main Line Service ===
Service as of April 29, 2006
Type	Northern Routes	Southern Routes
Local	6 / 8	6 / 8
Express Monday through Saturday all day	B14 / C15 / C19 / D21 / B73	F14 / H15 / F19 / H21 / H74
Express Monday through Saturday; Mixed service, rush and non-rush	C17 / B27	H17 / H27
Express Saturday; All Day	C17	H17
Express Sunday and holidays	C91 / B92 / D95	F91 / H92 / J95

=== Feeder routes ===
This station does not have connections to feeder routes.

=== Inter-city service ===
This station does not have inter-city service.

== See also ==
- Bogotá
- TransMilenio
- List of TransMilenio Stations
