= Calle 26 (TransMilenio) =

Bus stop in Bogotá, Colombia

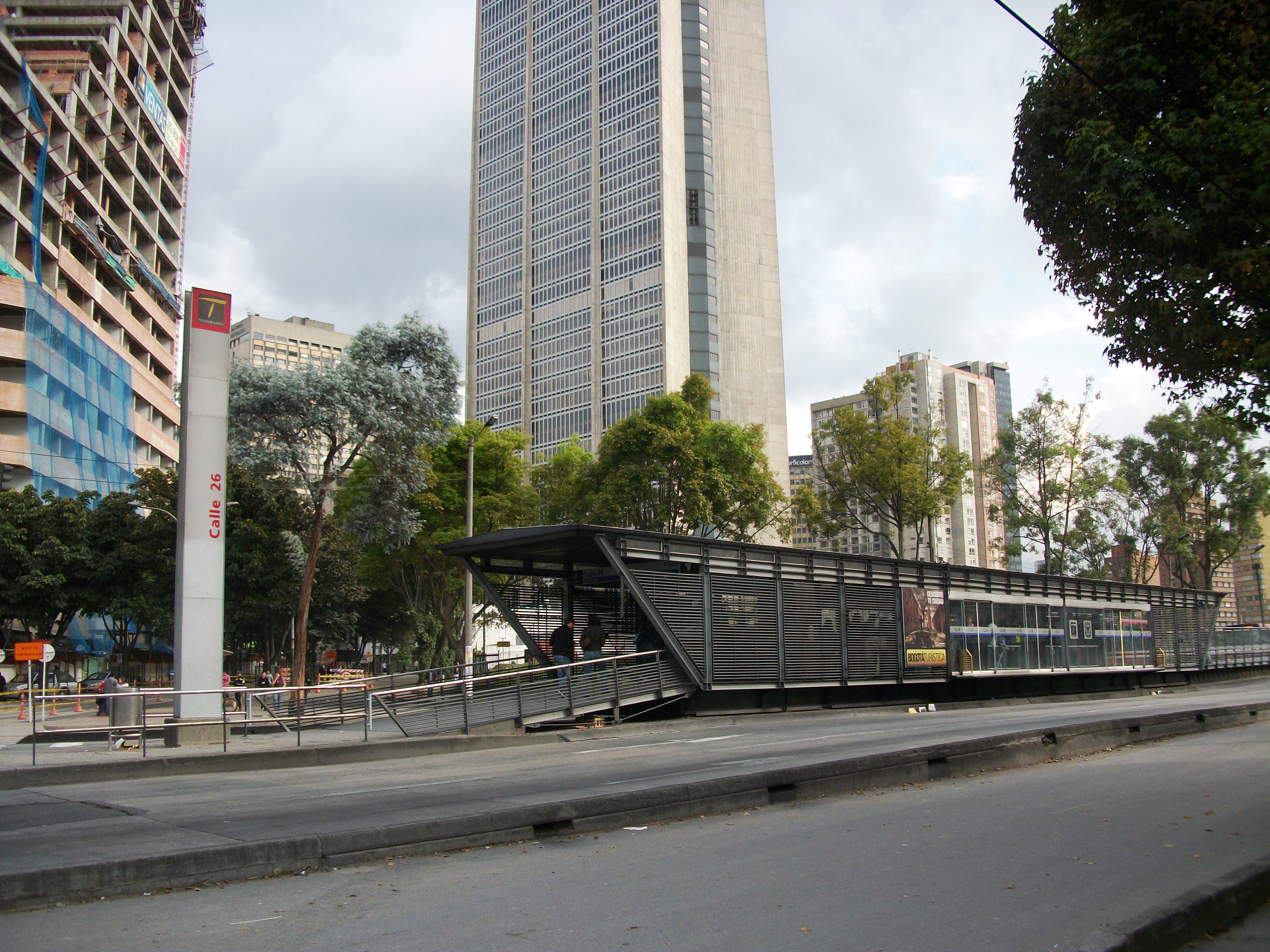

General information
- Location: Avenida Caracas between Calles 26 and 28. Santa Fe and Teusaquillo
- Line(s): Caracas
- Platforms: 3

History
- Opened: December 17, 2017

Services
Preceding station	TransMilenio	Following station
Calle 34 towards Calle 76	A	Calle 22 towards Tercer Milenio

The simple-station Calle 26 is part of the TransMilenio mass-transit system of Bogotá, Colombia, opened in the year 2000.

== Location ==
The station is located in the heart of downtown Bogotá, specifically on Avenida Caracas between Calles 26 and 28.

== History ==
In 2000, phase one of the TransMilenio system was opened between Portal de la 80 and Tercer Milenio, including this station. The station is named Calle 26 due to its proximity to Avenida El Dorado, also known as Calle 26.

It offers services to passengers travelling from downtown Bogotá and the Centro Internacional de Bogotá. It also serves the neighborhoods of Cementerio Central, Armenia, and Alameda.

The National Museum of Colombia is located about 500 meters from the station.

== Station services ==
=== Old trunk services ===
Services rendered until April 29, 2006
Kind	Routes	Frequency
Current		Every 3 minutes on average
Express	Expreso 10 Expreso 50	Every 2 minutes on average
Super Express	Expreso 200 Expreso 201 Expreso 300 Expreso 301	Every 2 minutes on average
Express Dominical	Expreso Dominical 15	Every 3 or 4 minutes on average

=== Main line service ===
Service as of April 29, 2006
Type	Northern Routes	Southern Routes
Local	8	8
Express Monday through Saturday; All day	B14 / C19 / D20 / B23 / D70	F14 / F19 / H20 / K23 / J24
Express Monday through Saturday; Morning rush	D50 / D51	
Express Monday through Saturday; Evening rush		F62
Express Monday through Friday; Mixed service, rush and non-rush	C29	F29 / H73
Express Sundays and holidays	D95	J95
Start and Ending routes
Tipo	Northern Routes	Southern Routes
Ruta fácil	6	6

=== Feeder routes ===
This station does not have connections to feeder routes.

=== Inter-city service ===
This station does not have inter-city service.

== See also ==
- Bogotá
- TransMilenio
- List of TransMilenio Stations
