= Colombia lunar sample displays =

- Regolith rock
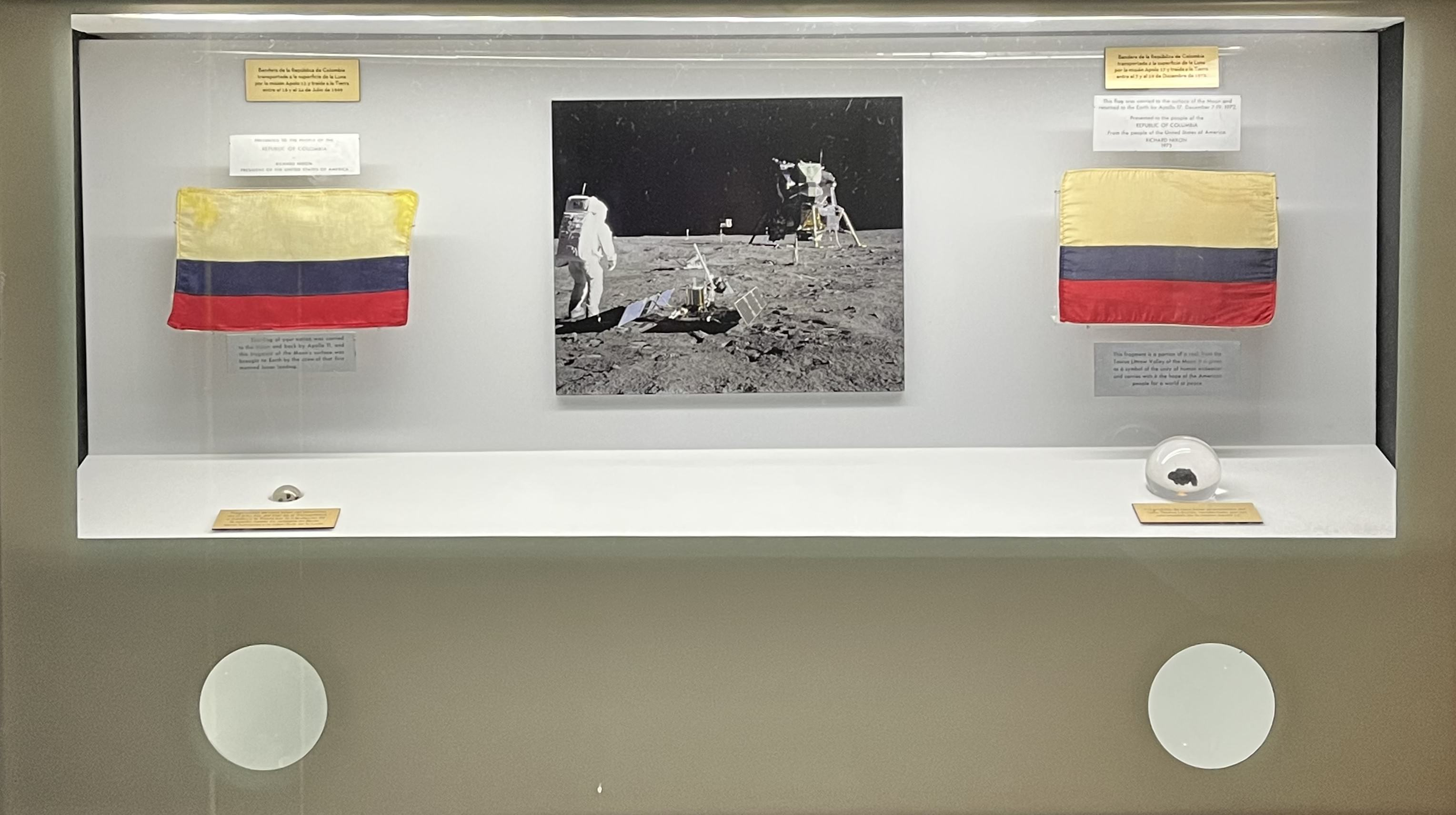
- Apollo 11 (left) and Apollo 17 (right) displays exhibited at the Bogotá Planetarium
- Coordinates: 4°36′43″N 074°04′08″W

The Colombia lunar sample displays are two unmounted commemorative plaques consisting of small fragments of Moon rock brought back with the Apollo 11 and Apollo 17 lunar missions. The samples are part of the permanent collection of the Bogotá Planetarium where they are displayed to the general public along with the flags of Colombia which were transported aboard the Apollo missions and other related documents and photographs.

== Description ==
=== Apollo 11 ===
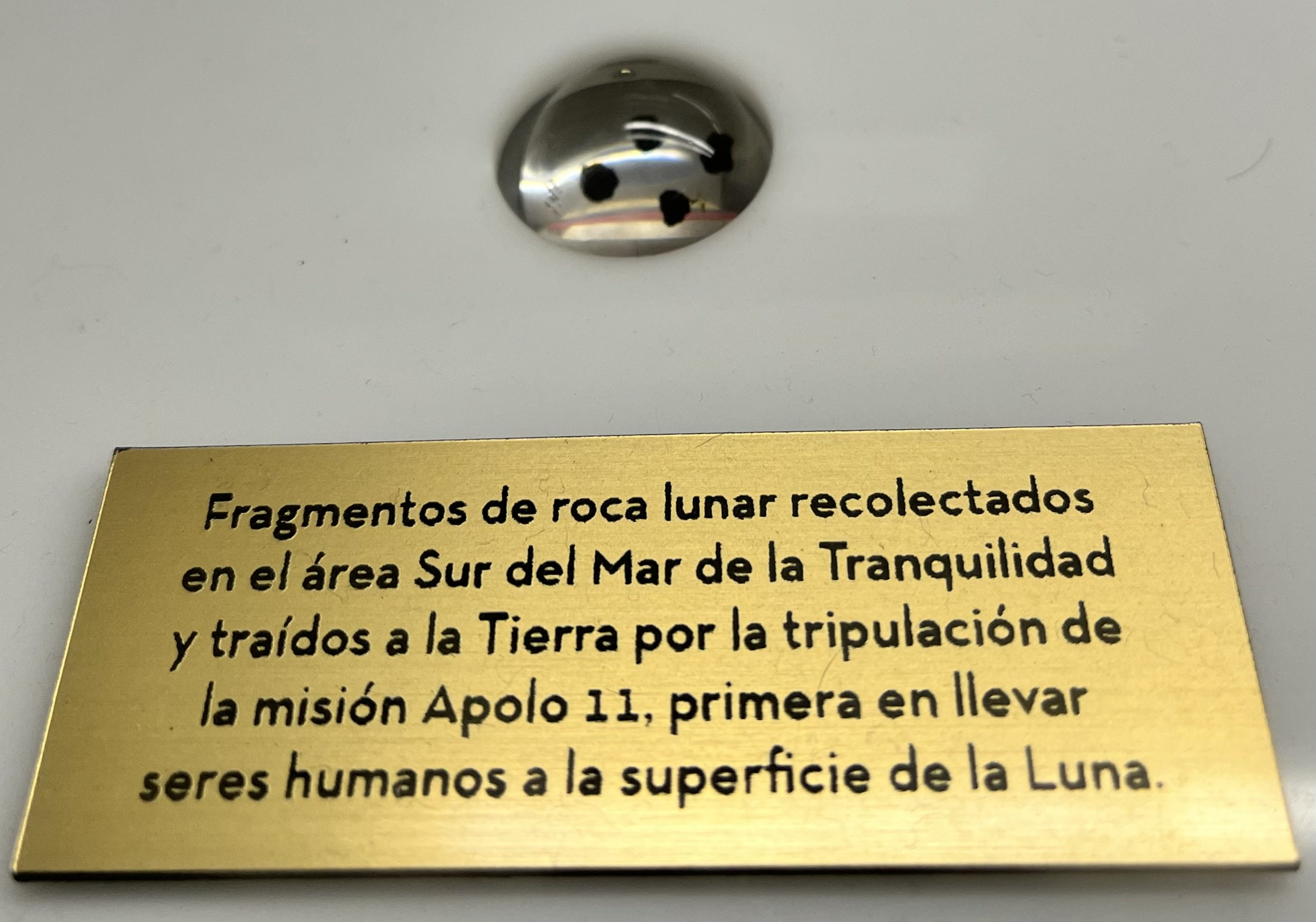
Mare Tranquillitatis regolith of Colombia's Apollo 11 sample display

At the request of then United States President Richard Nixon, NASA had about 250 presentation plaques made following Apollo 11 in 1969. Each included about four rice-sized particles of Moon dust from the mission totaling about 50 mg. The Apollo 11 lunar sample display has an acrylic plastic button containing the Moon dust mounted with the recipient's country or state flag that had been to the Moon and back. All 135 countries received the display, as did the 50 states of the United States and the U.S. provinces and the United Nations.

The plaques were given as gifts by Nixon in 1970.

Since being placed on public viewing, the Colombia Apollo 11 lunar display has been dismounted from the wooden stand in which it was originally presented and placed in a custom display case along with the Apollo 17 lunar display.

=== Apollo 17 ===
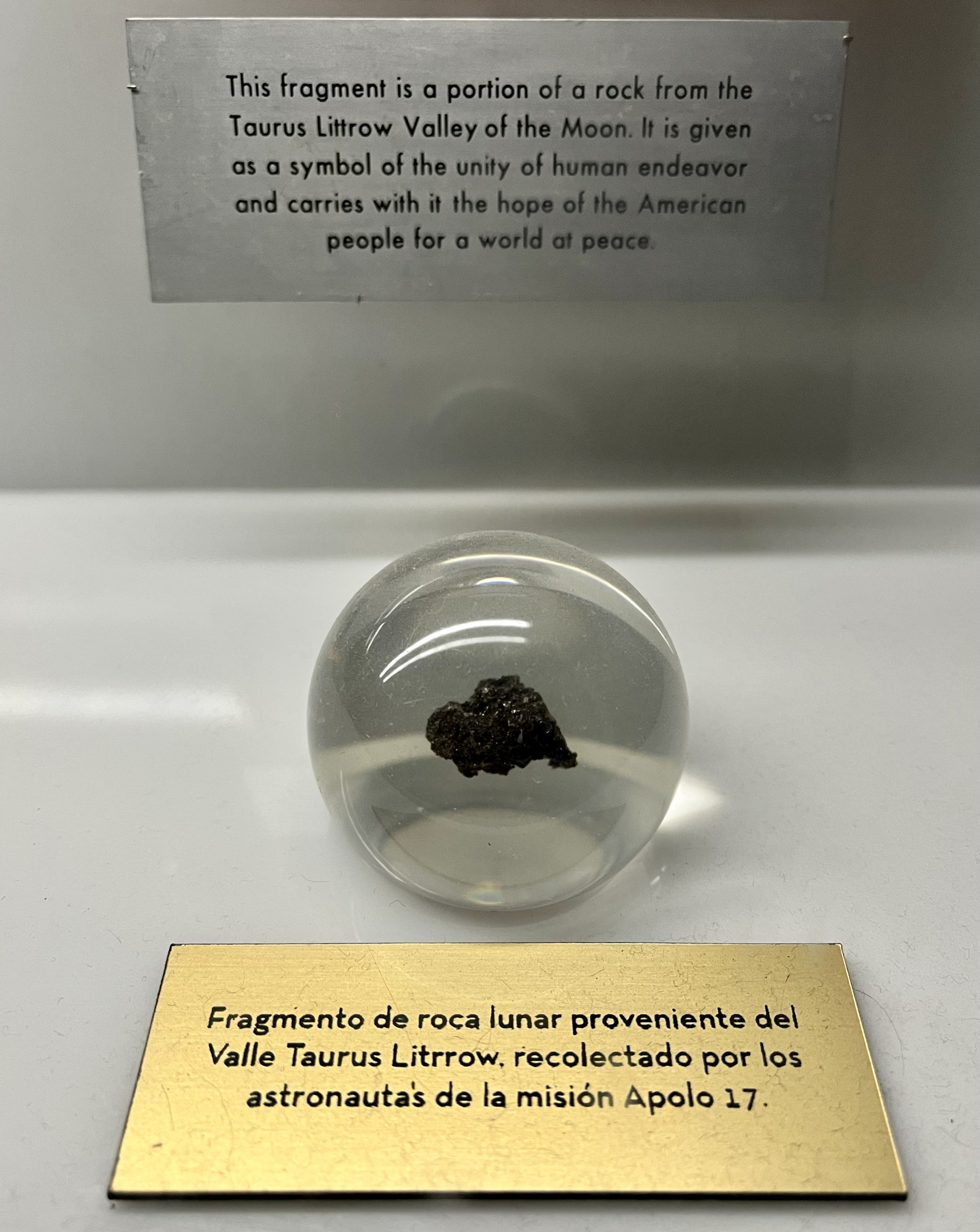
Taurus–Littrow regolith of Colombia's Apollo 17 sample display

The sample Moon rock collected during the Apollo 17 mission was later named lunar basalt 70017, and dubbed the Goodwill rock. Pieces of the rock weighing about 1.14 grams were placed inside a piece of acrylic lucite, and mounted, along with a flag of the country which would receive it, that had flown on Apollo 17.

In 1973, then United States President Richard Nixon had the plaques sent to 135 countries, including Colombia, as a goodwill gesture. The display for Colombia was personally presented by Neil Armstrong to the people of Colombia.

Since being placed on public viewing, the Colombia Apollo 17 lunar display has been dismounted from the wooden stand in which it was originally presented and placed in a custom display case along with the Apollo 11 lunar display.

== History ==
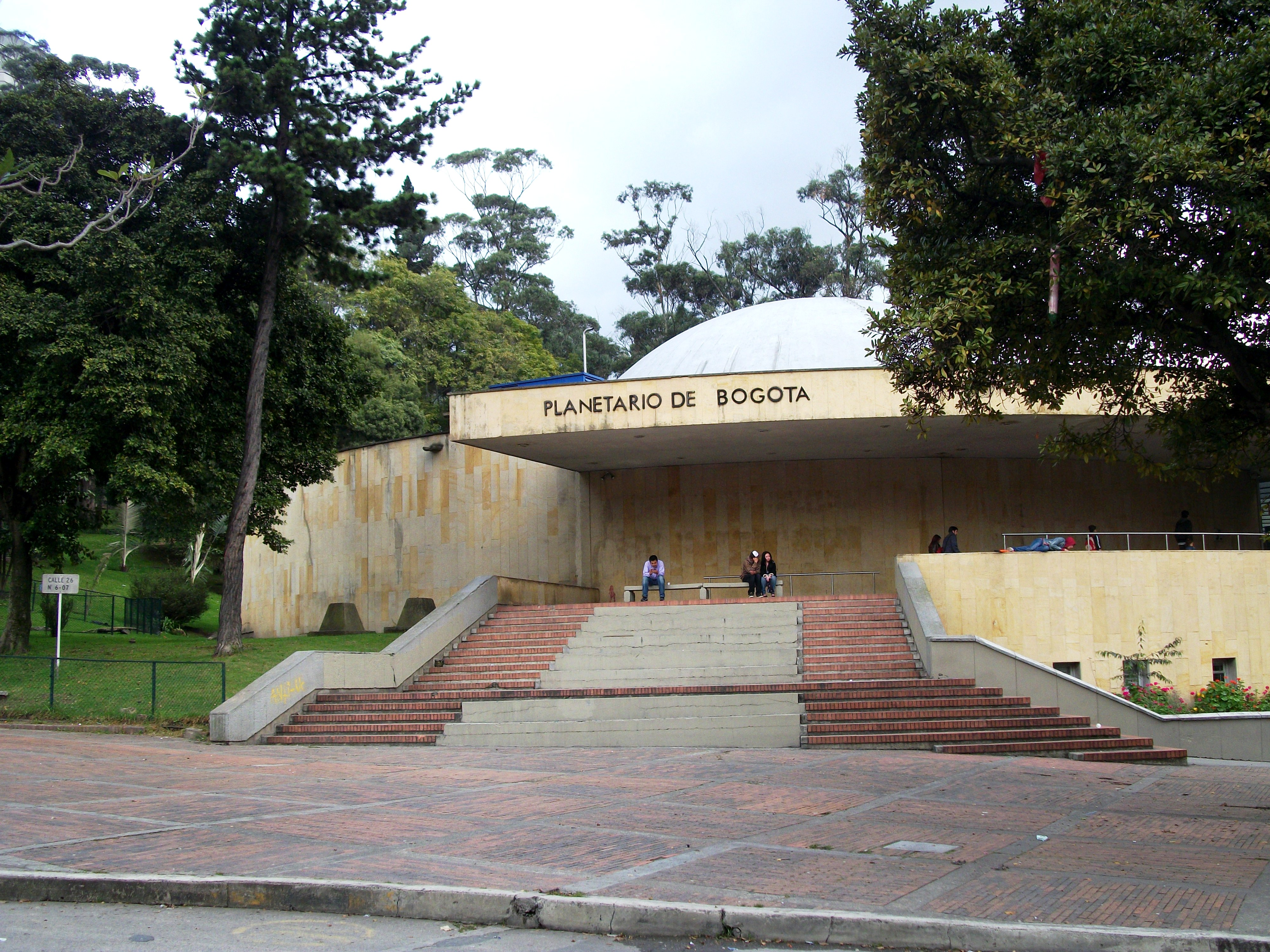
The Bogotá Planetarium, where both of Colombia's lunar sample displays are permanently exhibited

Misael Pastrana Borrero, as President of Colombia between 1970 and 1974, received from Neil Armstrong (Note: On behalf of then United States President Richard Nixon.) both lunar sample displays which he kept on his desk at the Casa de Nariño. Allegedly believing that the displays were a personal diplomatic gift, Pastrana kept the Moon rocks after the end of his presidential term as interior decoration in the living room of his private residence in Bogotá.

It was not until 1980 when journalist Daniel Samper Pizano, in search of the thought to be missing lunar displays, embarked on a mission that included contacting the Embassy of the United States in Bogotá which confirmed that the displays were not a personal gift to then President Pastrana but rather to all people of Colombia. Having received this information, Samper published an article with the allegation that Pastrana had stolen the lunar displays prompting Juan Carlos Pastrana, son of Misael Pastrana Borrero, to bestow the displays to the Bogotá Planetarium on behalf of his father.

Since their return to public hands, the lunar sample displays remained in secured storage within the Bogotá Planetarium until 2003 when they were displayed for the first time to the public as part of the planetarium's permanent collection.
