= Marley (disambiguation) =

Bob Marley (1945–1981) was a Jamaican singer-songwriter and musician.

Marley may also refer to:

== People ==
- Marley (surname)
- Baron Marley, a title in the Peerage of the United Kingdom
  - Dudley Aman, 1st Baron Marley
- Alejandro Wiebe, nicknamed "Marley", Argentine TV host

== People with the given name Marley ==
- Marley Aké (born 2001), French footballer
- Marley Brown, American rugby league player
- Marley Canales (born 1997), American professional soccer player
- Marley Caribu (1947–2018), Japanese writer
- Marley Dias (born 2005), African-American activist and feminist
- Marley G. Kelly (1892–1956), American businessman and politician
- Marley Leuluai (born 2006), New Zealand association football player
- Marley Mackey, Member post-punk band Warmduscher
- Marley Marl (born 1962), American DJ
- Marley Marshall-Miranda (born 2002), Spanish born English professional footballer
- Marley Pearce (born 2003), Australian rugby union player
- Marley Pryde (1967–2025), American professional wrestler
- Marley Raikiwasa (born 2005), Australian discus thrower and shot putter
- Marley Redfern (born 2002), Scottish footballer
- Marley Rose (born 2002), English professional footballer
- Marley Sebastian (born 1983), American professional wrestler
- Marley Shelton (born 1974), American actress
- Marley Shriver (1937–2016), American swimmer
- Marley Spearman (1928–2011), English amateur golfer
- Marley Tavaziva (born 2004), British professional footballer
- Marley Watkins (born 1990), Welsh footballer
- Marley Wilcox-Nanai, Member New Zealand boy band Moorhouse
- Marley Williams (born 1993), Australian rules footballer
- Marley Zarcone (born 1983), Canadian comic book artist

== Fictional characters ==
- Marley Kelly, a fictional character played by Luke Bailey in the BBC drama series Waterloo Road
- Marley Love, a fictional character from the NBC soap Another World then CBS soap As the World Turns
- Jacob Marley, a fictional character from Charles Dickens' 1843 novella A Christmas Carol
- Marley Rose, a fictional character played by Melissa Benoist in the FOX musical comedy series Glee

== Places ==
- Marley, Canterbury, Kent, England
- Marley, Dover, hamlet in Kent, England
- Marley, Maidstone, hamlet in Kent, England
- Marley, Illinois, United States

== Other uses ==
- Marley (film), a 2012 documentary on Bob Marley
  - Marley (soundtrack), a soundtrack album from the film
- A Labrador Retriever featured in the book Marley & Me and the film based on it
- Marley floor, a type of vinyl flooring used for dance

== See also ==
- Marly (disambiguation)
