= Calle 45 (TransMilenio) =

Bus stop in Bogotá, Colombia

Calle 45 - American School Way
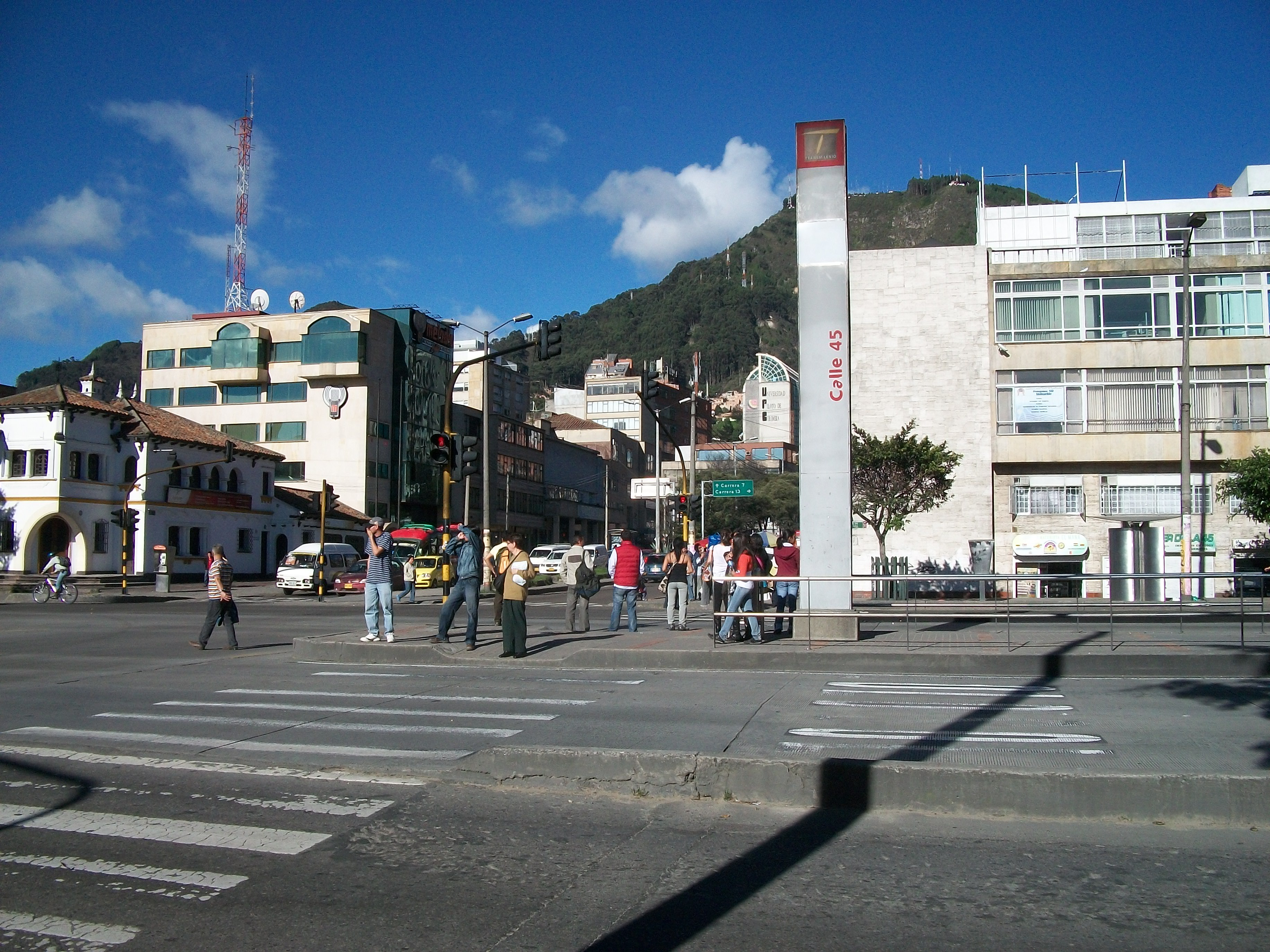

General information
- Location: Avenida Caracas between Calles 45 and 42; Chapinero and Teusaquillo
- Line(s): Caracas
- Platforms: 3

History
- Opened: December 17, 2017

Services
Preceding station	TransMilenio	Following station
Marly towards Calle 76	A	Avenida 39 towards Tercer Milenio

The simple-station Calle 45 - American School Way is part of the TransMilenio mass-transit system of Bogotá, Colombia, opened in year 2000.

== Location ==
The station is located north of downtown Bogotá, specifically on Avenida Caracas, between Calles 42 and 45.

== History ==
In 2000, phase one of the TransMilenio system was opened between Portal de la 80 and Tercer Milenio, including this station.

The station is named Calle 45 - American School Way because of its proximity to the street of that name. The service covers the demands of the students who attend the Universidad Distrital Francisco José de Caldas, Universidad Piloto and Universidad Javeriana. It also serves the neighborhoods of Palermo, Sucre, Santa Teresita, and Clinica Nueva.

On March 9, 2012, protests lodged by mostly young children in groups of up to 200, blocked in several times and up to 3 hours in the trunk stations Caracas. The protests left destroyed and sacked this season of the system.

== Station services ==
=== Old trunk services ===
Services rendered until April 29, 2006
Kind	Routes	Frequency
Current	2 Portal Norte 3 Portal Norte	Every 3 minutes on average
Express	Expreso 10 Expreso 40 Expreso 60 Expreso 90 Expreso 100	Every 2 minutes on average
Express Dominical	Expreso Dominical 25 Expreso Dominical 35	Every 3 or 4 minutes on average

=== Main Line Service ===
Service as of April 29, 2006
Type	Northern Routes	Southern Routes
Local	6 / 8	6 / 8
Express Monday through Saturday all day	B14 / C15 / B18 / C19 / D20 / B23	F14 / H15 / L18 / F19 / H20 / K23
Express Monday through Saturday morning rush	D50 / D51	
Express Monday through Saturday evening rush		F62
Express Monday through Saturday; Mixed service, rush and non-rush		H73
Express Sunday and holidays	C91 / B92 / D95	F91 / H92 / J95

=== Feeder routes ===
This station does not have connections to feeder routes.

=== Inter-city service ===
This station does not have inter-city service.

== See also ==
- Bogotá
- TransMilenio
- List of TransMilenio Stations
