= Pilot University of Colombia =

Private coeducational research university in Colombia

Coordinates: 4°37′56″N 74°3′55″W

- Universidad Piloto de Colombia
- Motto: Un espacio para la evolución
- Motto in English: A space for evolution
- Type: Private
- Established: 1962
- Location: Cra. 9 #45A-44, Bogotá, Cundinamarca, Colombia
- Nickname: UNIPILOTO
- Website: www.unipiloto.edu.co

The Pilot University of Colombia (Spanish: Universidad Piloto de Colombia) is a private, national, coeducational research university, located primarily in Bogotá, Colombia. It offers academic programs in undergraduate, specializations, masters and doctorates. Its president is Patricia Piedrahíta Castillo.

== History ==
In 1962, a group of architecture students of the University of America (Universidad de América), showed their nonconformity before the mechanisms of education and academic formation established in the educational system of the University. The disagreement was that the architectural models taught were for european geography, and therefore, it was difficult to apply to the colombian geographical structure.

As a result of this, a student movement was created with the aim of reforming said system and restructuring it through an institution that responded to the needs of the young students. By August of the same year, a large number of students formed by work teams and under legal, economic and human management responsibilities, were installed in the National Park Theater temporarily, headed by students of higher semesters.

A group of senators of the Republic, among which include doctors Alfonso Palacio Rudas and Raúl Vásquez Vélez, decided to participate in the magnificent idea and provided the students and parents with the Elliptical Hall of the National Capitol, so that they would gather, discuss and approve the statutes on September 14, 1962 and give rise to the university, which was named Corporación Universidad Piloto de Colombia.

== Campuses ==
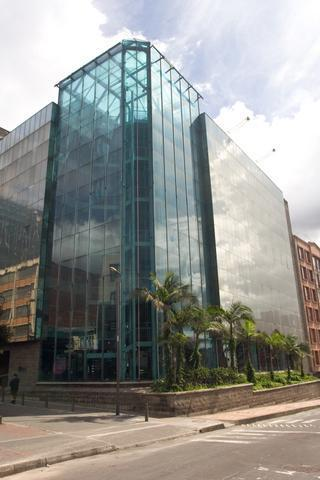
Photo of the APR building at the Bogotá campus

=== Bogotá campus ===
The university has 12 buildings made up of administrative headquarters, headquarters for postgraduate degrees, faculties, halls and laboratories for architecture, engineering and psychology. The best-known buildings are called "Alfonso Palacio Rudas" ("APR"), building "Fundadores" ("F"), and building "José Alberto Alvarado" ("G"), characterized by its modern infrastructure, composed of crystalline material and concrete. It has 15 undergraduate programs.

=== Girardot campus ===
The university also has a headquarters located in Girardot, Colombia, consisting of 4 buildings, located in an area of 2,144.83 square meters.
