= Calle 76 (TransMilenio) =

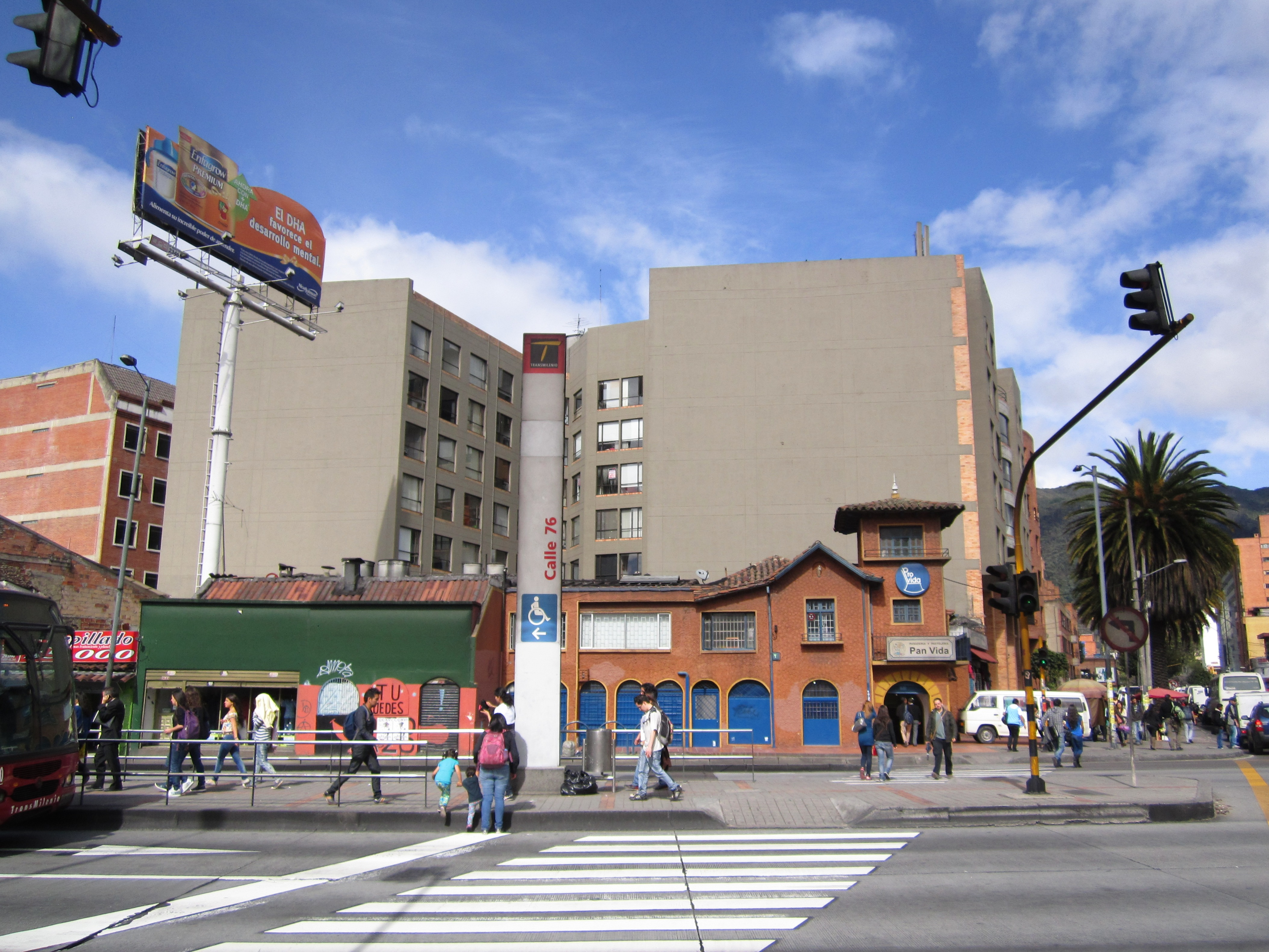

General information
- Location: Avenida Caracas between Calles 74 and 76; Chapinero and Barrios Unidos; Colombia

History
- Opened: 2000

Services
Preceding station	TransMilenio	Following station
Heroes towards Terminal	B	Calle 72 towards Héroes
Polo towards Portal de la 80	D	Terminus

The simple-station Calle 76 is part of the TransMilenio mass-transit system of Bogotá, Colombia, opened in the year 2000.

== Location ==
The station is located in northern Bogotá, specifically on Avenida Caracas, between Calles 74 and 76.

== History ==
In 2000, phase one of the TransMilenio system was opened between Portal de la 80 and Tercer Milenio, including this station.

The station is named Calle 76 due to its proximity to the arterial route of the same name.

It serves the demand of the Porcúncula, Juan XXIII, Lago Gaitán and San Felipe neighborhoods. Points of interest near the station include the Unilago technology shopping center and the Centro de Alta Tecnología.

Since its opening, it has been the most congested simple station, receiving over 600,000 users daily. This congestion has been reduced due to the Expreso 140, which began service in February 2006, alleviating the need of users coming from Autopista Norte to Calle 80 to transfer at this station, notably improving the quality of service.

On May 15, 2012, near the station, there was an explosion. According to the latest version, the explosive device was placed by a man who was on foot and stuck a limpet-type pump in the driver's door of the Humvee in which he was carrying former Interior and Justice Minister Fernando Londono. The total balance of the attack were 2 deaths, more than 19 injured and incalculable moral and material damages.

In the early morning of May 27, 2014, the attacks against this station were registered. On that occasion, the stations Flores (TransMilenio) and Calle 76 were destroyed at the point of guns of balinese, where they left $ 40 million pesos in losses.

== Station Services ==
=== Old trunk services ===
Services rendered until April 29, 2006
Kind	Routes	Frequency
Current		Every 3 minutes on average
Express	Expreso 10 Expreso 30 Expreso 50 Expreso 70	Every 2 minutes on average
Express Dominical	Expreso Dominical 15 Expreso Dominical 25 Expreso Dominical 35	Every 3 or 4 minutes on average

=== Main Line Service ===
Service as of April 29, 2006
Type	Northern Routes	Southern Routes
Local	6 / 8	6 / 8
Express Every Day All day	C15 B75	H15 H75
Express Monday through Saturday all day	D21	H21
Express Monday through Saturday morning rush	D50 / B52	A51 / A52 / A74
Express Monday through Saturday evening rush		G52 / F62
Express Monday through Saturday; Mixed service, rush and non-rush	B27	H27
Express Monday through Saturday; Morning and Evening rush	B74	J74
Express Monday through Friday; Mixed service, rush and non-rush	C17	H17
Express Saturday; All Day	C17	H17

=== Feeder routes ===
This station does not have connections to feeder routes.

=== Inter-city service ===
This station does not have inter-city service.

== See also ==
- Bogotá
- TransMilenio
- List of TransMilenio Stations
