= Mandalay (TransMilenio) =

Bus stop in Bogotá, Colombia

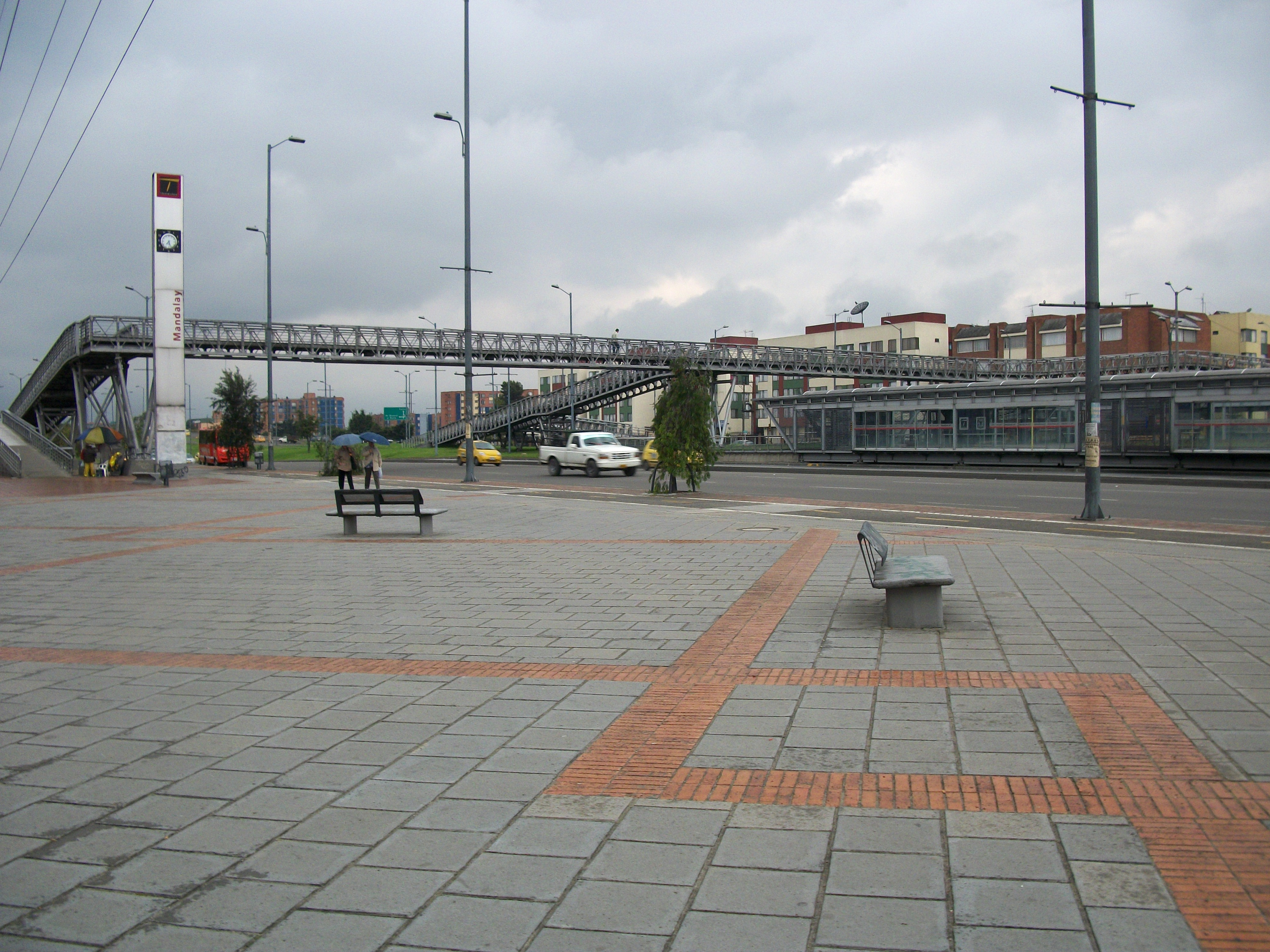

General information
- Location: Kennedy (Bogotá); Colombia

History
- Opened: January 2004

Services
Preceding station	TransMilenio	Following station
Américas–Avenida Boyacá towards Avenida Jiménez	F	Banderas towards Portal de Las Américas

The simple station Mandalay is part of the TransMilenio mass-transit system of Bogotá, Colombia, which opened in the year 2000.

== Location ==
The station is located in southwestern Bogotá, specifically on Avenida de Las Américas with Carrera 73.

== History ==
In 2003, the Las Américas line was extended from Distrito Grafiti to Transversal 86, including this station.

The station is named Mandalay due to the neighborhood located to the south of the station.

== Station services ==
=== Old trunk services ===
Services rendered until April 29, 2006
Kind	Routes	Frequency
Current		Every 3 minutes on average

=== Main line service ===
Service as of April 29, 2006
Type	North or East Routes	Western Routes	Frequency
Local	5	5	Every three minutes
Express Monday through Saturday; All day	C19 / M51	F19 / F51	Every two minutes

=== Feeder routes ===
This station does not have connections to feeder routes.

=== Inter-city service ===
This station does not have inter-city service.

== See also ==
- Bogotá
- TransMilenio
- List of TransMilenio Stations
