= Américas–Avenida Boyacá (TransMilenio) =

Bus stop in Bogotá, Colombia

General information
- Location: Kennedy (Bogotá); Colombia

History
- Opened: January 2004

Services
Preceding station	TransMilenio	Following station
Marsella towards Avenida Jiménez	F	Mandalay towards Portal de Las Américas

Américas–Avenida Boyacá, formerly Mundo Aventura, is part of the TransMilenio mass-transit system of Bogotá, Colombia, which opened in the year 2000.

== Location ==
The station is located in southwestern Bogotá, specifically on Avenida de Las Américas with Transversal 71C.

It serves the Marsella and Techo neighborhoods, the Clinica de Occidente, and the Plaza de las Américas shopping center.

== History ==
In 2003, the Las Américas line was extended from Distrito Grafiti to Transversal 86, including this station.

The station was named Mundo Aventura after the amusement park located nearby and joined by a foot and bike path along Transversal 71 D.

This station has a Punto de Encuentro or meeting point, which has bathrooms, coffeeshop, parking for bicycles and a tourist attention booth.

== Station services ==
=== Old trunk services ===
Services rendered until April 29, 2006
Kind	Routes	Frequency
Current		Every 3 minutes on average

=== Main line service ===
Service as of April 29, 2006
Type	North or East Routes	Western Routes	Frequency
Local	5	5	Every three minutes
Express Monday through Saturday; All day	J23 / M51	F23 / F51	Every two minutes
Express Sundays and holidays	M99	F99	Every 3-4 minutes

=== Complementary routes ===
This station does have connections to Complementary routes.

=== Inter-city service ===
This station does not have inter-city service.

== See also ==
- Bogotá
- TransMilenio
- List of TransMilenio Stations
