= Banderas (TransMilenio) =

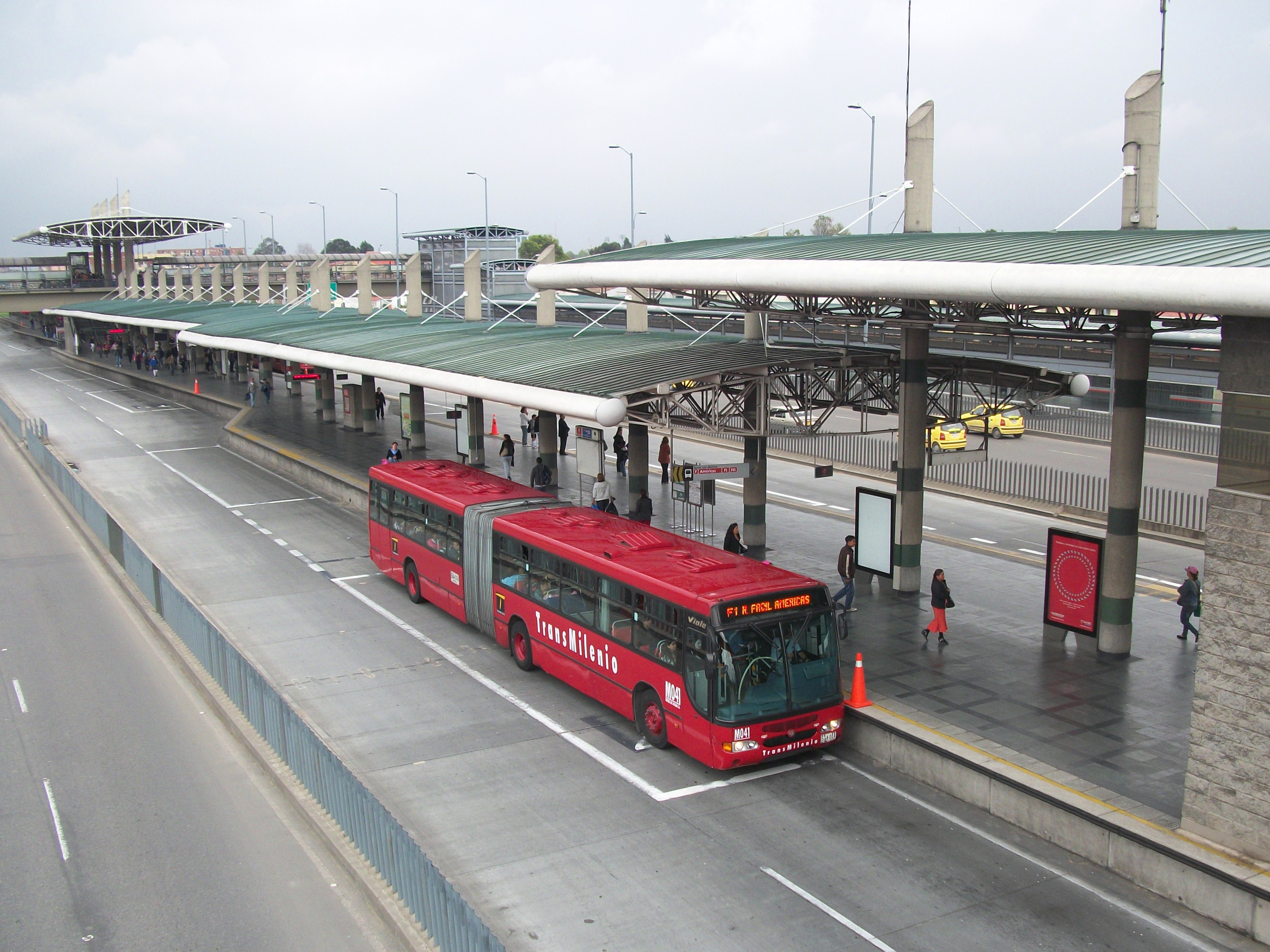

General information
- Location: Kennedy (Bogotá); Colombia

History
- Opened: 2003

Services
Preceding station	TransMilenio	Following station
Mandalay towards Avenida Jiménez	F	Transversal 86 towards Portal de Las Américas

The intermediate station Banderas is part of the TransMilenio mass-transit system of Bogotá, Colombia, which opened in the year 2000.

== Location ==
The station is located in southwestern Bogotá, specifically on Avenida de Las Américas with Carrera 75 and 78H, near the Monumento a las Banderas (Monument to the Flags).

== Origin of the name ==
The station receives its name from the Monument to the Flags (In Spanish, Monumento a las Banderas), built in 1948.

== History ==
In the year 2003 the Transmilenio trunk of the Americas was inaugurated from the station Americas Carrera 53 A (nowadays known as Distrito Grafiti), until the station Transversal 86 (TransMilenio), which includes the Banderas station. When it was first opened, this station had no feeding services, however, by early 2004, these were implemented.

This station has a large cycloparqueadero (an infrastructure designed to park bicycles), being also the first station of the system that counted on this service.

It is one of the most known stations of the system and, due to its large size, it has a portal-like appearance (portals are the name of most terminus stations in the Transmilenio system). The design of the central part of the station was replicated in stations of other systems of massive transport like the Metrobús of Mexico City.

It has two pedestrian bridges: one through which the station is accessed by, and an internalone that allows passengers to walk from the central part of the station (in the center of the Avenue), to the covered bays, where the feeding services are found. This design constitutes the new standard for the future intermediate stations of the system.

== Station services ==
=== Old trunk services ===
Services rendered until April 29, 2006
Kind	Routes	Frequency
Current		Every 3 minutes on average
Express	Expreso 80 Expreso 100 Expreso 120 Expreso 170	Every 2 minutes on average
Express Dominical	Expreso Dominical 45	Every 3 or 4 minutes on average

=== Main line service ===
Service as of April 29, 2006
Type	North or East Routes	Western Routes	Frequency
Local	5	5	Every three minutes
Express Monday through Saturday; All day	B14 / C19 / J23 / M51	F14 / F19 / F23 / F51	Every two minutes
Express Monday through Saturday; Morning rush	B52 / E32		Every two minutes
Express Monday through Saturday; Evening rush		F62 / F32	Every two minutes
Express Monday through Friday; Mixed service, rush and non-rush	B28 / C29	F28 / F29	Every two minutes
Express Sundays and holidays	C91 / M99	F91 / F99	Every 3-4 minutes

=== Feeding services ===
The following feeder routes also work:

South Platform (Kennedy Zone)

- Route 8.1 Back and forth to the central Kennedy Sector.
- Route 8.2 to the Kennedy Hospital sector.
- Route 8.4 Back and forth to the Corabastos sector .
- Route 8.6 to the Timiza neighborhood.

North Platform (Zona Tintal - Zona Franca)

- Route 8.3 Back and forth to the Castilla neighborhood.
- Route 8.5 Back and forth to the sector of the Tintal public library.

=== Inter-city service ===
This station does not have inter-city bus service.

== See also ==
- Bogotá
- TransMilenio
- List of TransMilenio Stations
