= Marsella (TransMilenio) =

Bus stop in Bogotá, Colombia

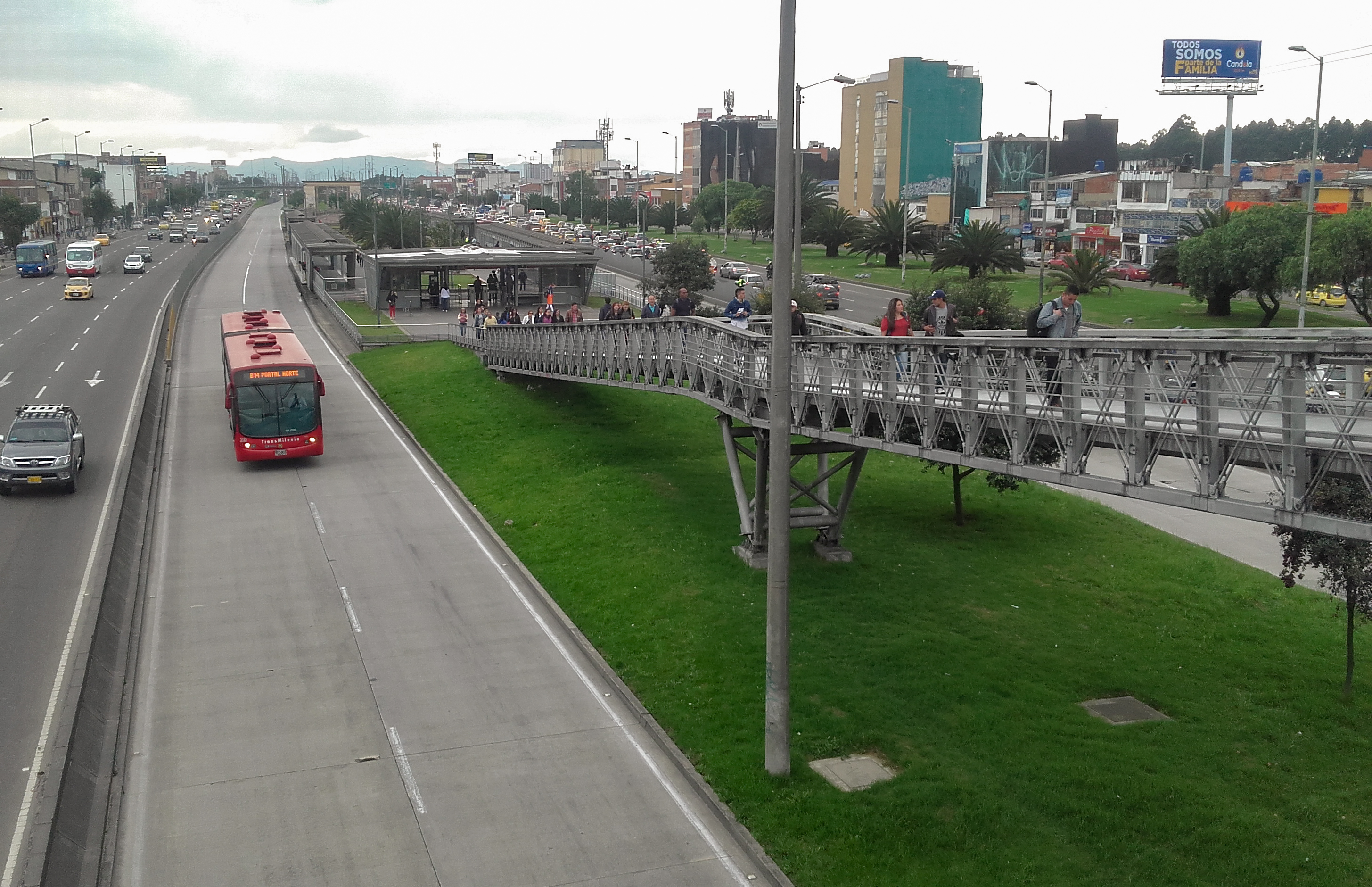

General information
- Location: Kennedy, Bogotá; Colombia

History
- Opened: December 2003

Services
Preceding station	TransMilenio	Following station
Pradera towards Avenida Jiménez	F	Américas–Avenida Boyacá towards Portal de Las Américas

The simple station Marsella is part of the TransMilenio mass-transit system of Bogotá, Colombia, which opened in the year 2000.

== Location ==
The station is located in the industrial sector of the city, specifically on Avenida de Las Américas with Carrera 69. It serves the Marsella, Nueva Marsella, Ferrol, and Lusitania nei

== History ==
In 2003, service on the Avenida de Las Américas line was extended from Distrito Grafiti to Transversal 86, including this station.

The station is named Marsella after the neighborhood that surrounds it.

== Station services ==
=== Old trunk services ===
Services rendered until April 29, 2006
Kind	Routes	Frequency
Current		Every 3 minutes on average
Express	Expreso 80	Every 2 minutes on average
Express Dominical	Expreso Dominical 45	Every 3 or 4 minutes on average

=== Main line service ===
Service as of April 29, 2006
Type	North or East Routes	Western Routes
Local	5	5
Express Every Day; All day	C19	F19
Express Monday through Saturday; All day	M51	F51
Express Monday through Saturday; Morning rush	B52	

=== Feeder routes ===
This station does not have connections to feeder routes.

=== Inter-city service ===
This station does not have inter-city service.

== See also ==
- Bogotá
- TransMilenio
- List of TransMilenio Stations
