= CDS Carrera 32 (TransMilenio) =

Bus stop in Bogotá, Colombia

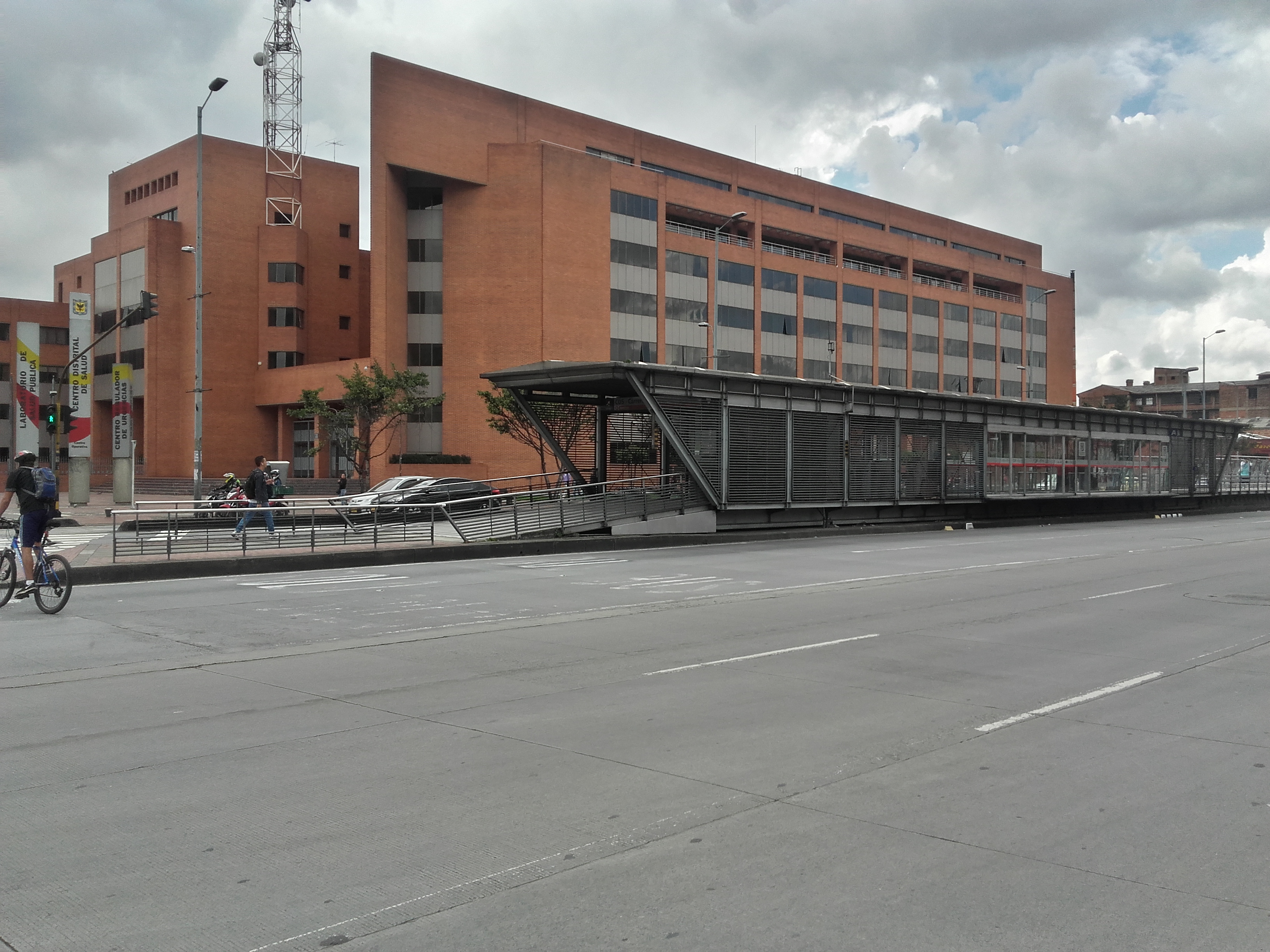

General information
- Location: Puente Aranda; Colombia

History
- Opened: 2003

Services
Preceding station	TransMilenio	Following station
Ricaurte towards Avenida Jiménez	F	Zona Industrial towards Portal de Las Américas
Location

The simple-station CDS Carrera 32 is part of the TransMilenio mass-transit system of Bogotá, Colombia, which opened in the year 2000.

== Location ==
The station is located close to downtown Bogotá, more specifically on the Troncal Calle 13 between Carreras 32 and 33.

== History ==
The station was opened in 2003 as part of the opening of Main Line Calle 13 from the De La Sabana station to Puente Aranda.

The name CDS refers to the acronym for Centro Distrital de Salud, which is located in the front of the station.

== Station services ==
=== Old trunk services ===
Services rendered until April 29, 2006
Kind	Routes	Frequency
Current		Every 3 minutes on average
Express	Expreso 100	Every 2 minutes on average

=== Main line service ===
Service as of April 29, 2006
Type	North or East Routes	Western Routes	Frequency
Local	5	5	Every three minutes
Express Monday through Saturday; All day	B14	F14	Every two minutes
Express Monday through Friday; Mixed service, rush and non-rush	B28	F28	Every two minutes

=== Feeder routes ===
This station does not have connections to feeder routes.

=== Inter-city service ===
This station does not have inter-city service.

== See also ==
- Bogotá
- TransMilenio
- List of TransMilenio Stations
