= San Façon Carrera 22 (TransMilenio) =

Bus stop in Bogotá, Colombia

San Façon-Carrera 22
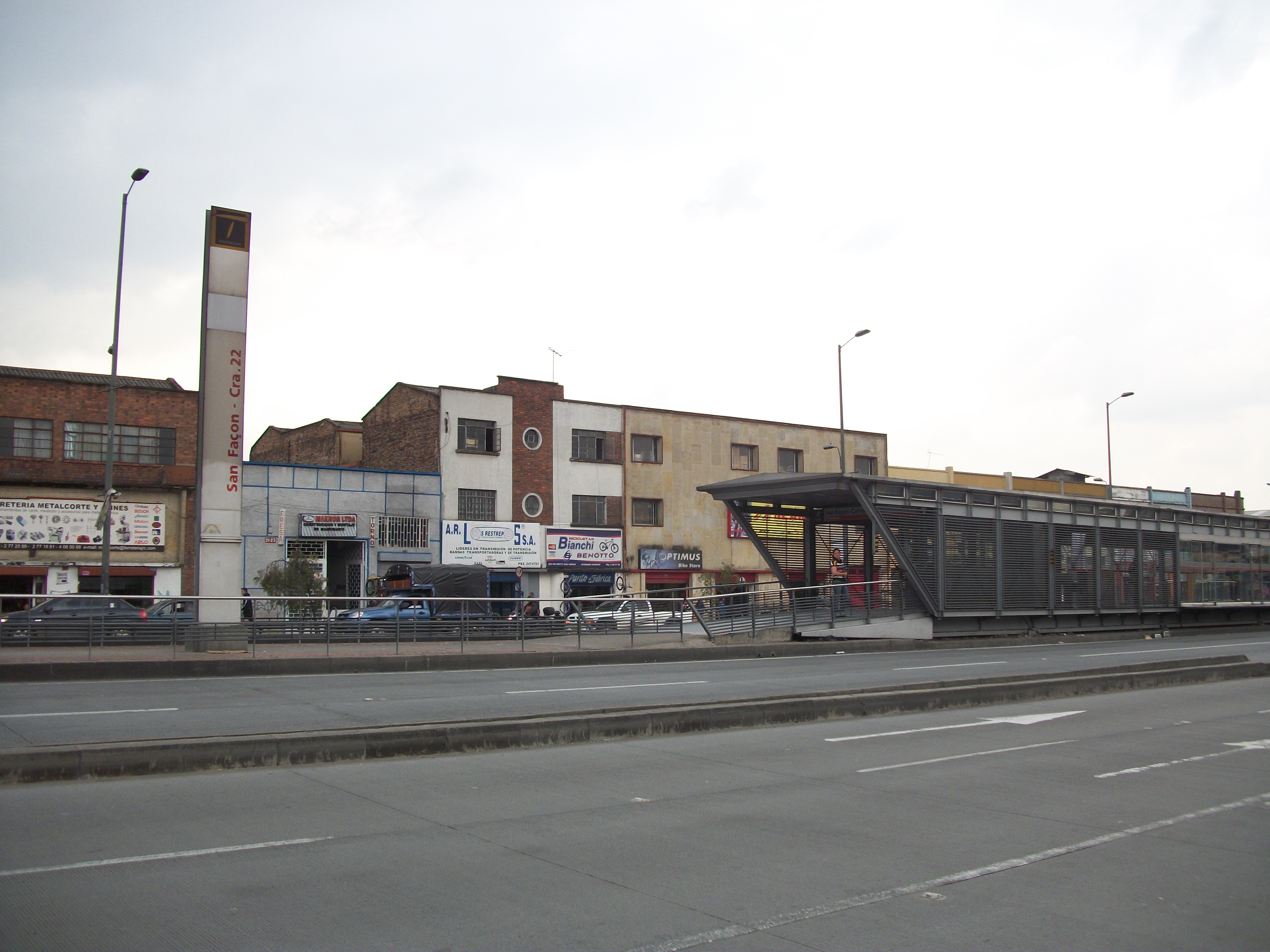

General information
- Location: Los Mártires; Colombia

History
- Opened: 2003

Services
Preceding station	TransMilenio	Following station
De La Sabana towards Avenida Jiménez	F	Ricaurte towards Portal de Las Américas
Location

The simple-station San Façon-Carrera 22 is part of the TransMilenio mass-transit system of Bogotá, Colombia, opened in the year 2003.

== Location ==
The station is located close to downtown Bogotá, more specifically on the Troncal Calle 13 between Carreras 21 and 23.

== History ==
The station was opened in 2003 as part of the opening of Main Line Calle 13 from the De La Sabana station to Puente Aranda.

== Station services ==
=== Old trunk services ===
Services rendered until April 29, 2006
Kind	Routes	Frequency
Current		Every 3 minutes on average
Express	Expreso 120	Every 2 minutes on average
Express Dominical	Expreso Dominical 45	Every 3 or 4 minutes on average

=== Main line service ===
Service as of April 29, 2006
Type	North or East Routes	Western Routes	Frequency
Local	5	5	Every three minutes
Express Monday through Saturday; All day	J23	F23	Every two minutes
Express Sundays and holidays	C91 / M99	F91 / F99	Every 3-4 minutes

=== Feeder routes ===
This station does not have connections to feeder routes.

=== Inter-city service ===
This station does not have inter-city service.

== See also ==
- Bogotá
- TransMilenio
- List of TransMilenio stations
