= Zona Industrial (TransMilenio) =

Bus stop in Bogotá, Colombia

General information
- Location: Puente Aranda; Colombia

History
- Opened: 2003

Services
Preceding station	TransMilenio	Following station
CDS Carrera 32 towards Avenida Jiménez	F	Carrera 43 towards Portal de Las Américas

The simple station Zona Industrial is part of the TransMilenio mass-transit system of Bogotá, Colombia, which opened in the year 2000.

== Location ==
The station is located near downtown Bogotá, specifically on Calle 13 between Carreras 38 and 42.

It serves the Zona Industrial, Estación Central (Central Station), and San Andresito.

== History ==
The station was opened in 2003 after completion of the Calle 13 portion of the Américas line, from De La Sabana to Puente Aranda.

On February 4, 2011, following a review by the DIAN in the premises of San Andresito of Cr 38, sector traders began a violent protest in which the station was stoned Zona Industrial next to a bus system, causing damage worth 100 million pesos.

== Station services ==
=== Old trunk services ===
Services rendered until April 29, 2006
Kind	Routes	Frequency
Current		Every 3 minutes on average
Express	Expreso 120	Every 2 minutes on average
Express Dominical	Expreso Dominical 45	Every 3 or 4 minutes on average

=== Main line service ===
Service as of April 29, 2006
Type	North or East Routes	Western Routes	Frequency
Local	5	5	Every three minutes
Express Monday through Saturday; All day	C19	F19	Every two minutes
Express Monday through Friday; Mixed service, rush and non-rush	B28	F28	Every two minutes
Express Sundays and holidays	C91	F91	Every 3-4 minutes

=== Feeder routes ===
This station does not have connections to feeder routes.

=== Inter-city service ===
This station does not have inter-city service.

== See also ==
- Bogotá
- TransMilenio
- List of TransMilenio Stations
