= Carrera 43 (TransMilenio) =

Transit station in Bogotá, Colombia

General information
- Location: Puente Aranda; Colombia

History
- Opened: 2003

Services
Preceding station	TransMilenio	Following station
Zona Industrial towards Avenida Jiménez	F	Puente Aranda towards Portal de Las Américas
Location

The simple station Carrera 43 is part of the TransMilenio mass-transit system of Bogotá, Colombia, which opened in the year 2000.

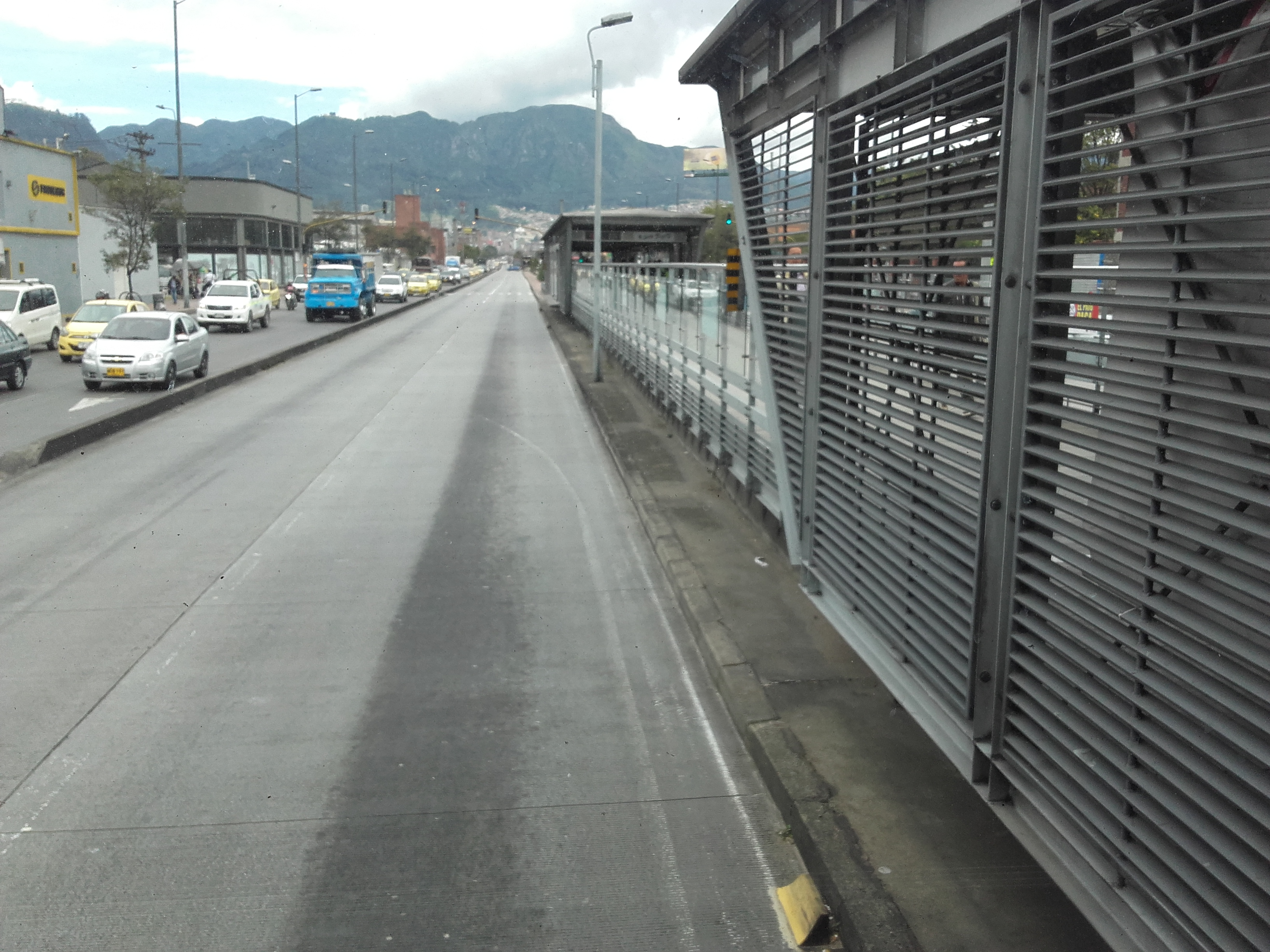
Carrera 43 (TransMilenio)

== Location ==
The station is located in Bogotá's industrial zone, specifically on Calle 13 between Carreras 41 and 42A Bis.

== History ==
The station was opened in 2003 after completion of the Calle 13 portion of the Américas line, from De La Sabana to Puente Aranda.

== Station services ==
=== Old trunk services ===
Services rendered until April 29, 2006
Kind	Routes	Frequency
Current		Every 3 minutes on average
Express	Expreso 170	Every 2 minutes on average

=== Main line service ===
Service as of April 29, 2006
Type	North or East Routes	Western Routes	Frequency
Local	5	5	Every three minutes
Express Monday through Saturday; All day	M51	F51	Every two minutes

=== Feeder routes ===
This station does not have connections to feeder routes.

=== Inter-city service ===
This station does not have inter-city service.

== See also ==
- Bogotá
- TransMilenio
- List of TransMilenio Stations
