= Pradera (TransMilenio) =

Bus stop in Bogotá, Colombia

General information
- Location: Puente Aranda; Colombia

History
- Opened: January 2004

Services
Preceding station	TransMilenio	Following station
Distrito Grafiti towards Avenida Jiménez	F	Marsella towards Portal de Las Américas

The simple station Pradera is part of the TransMilenio mass-transit system of Bogotá, Colombia, which opened in the year 2000.

== Location ==
The station is located in the industrial sector of the city, specifically on Avenida de Las Américas with Carrera 65. It serves the Pradera, Salazar Gómez, and Lusitania neighborhoods. It is also the nearest station to the recording studios of RCN Television.

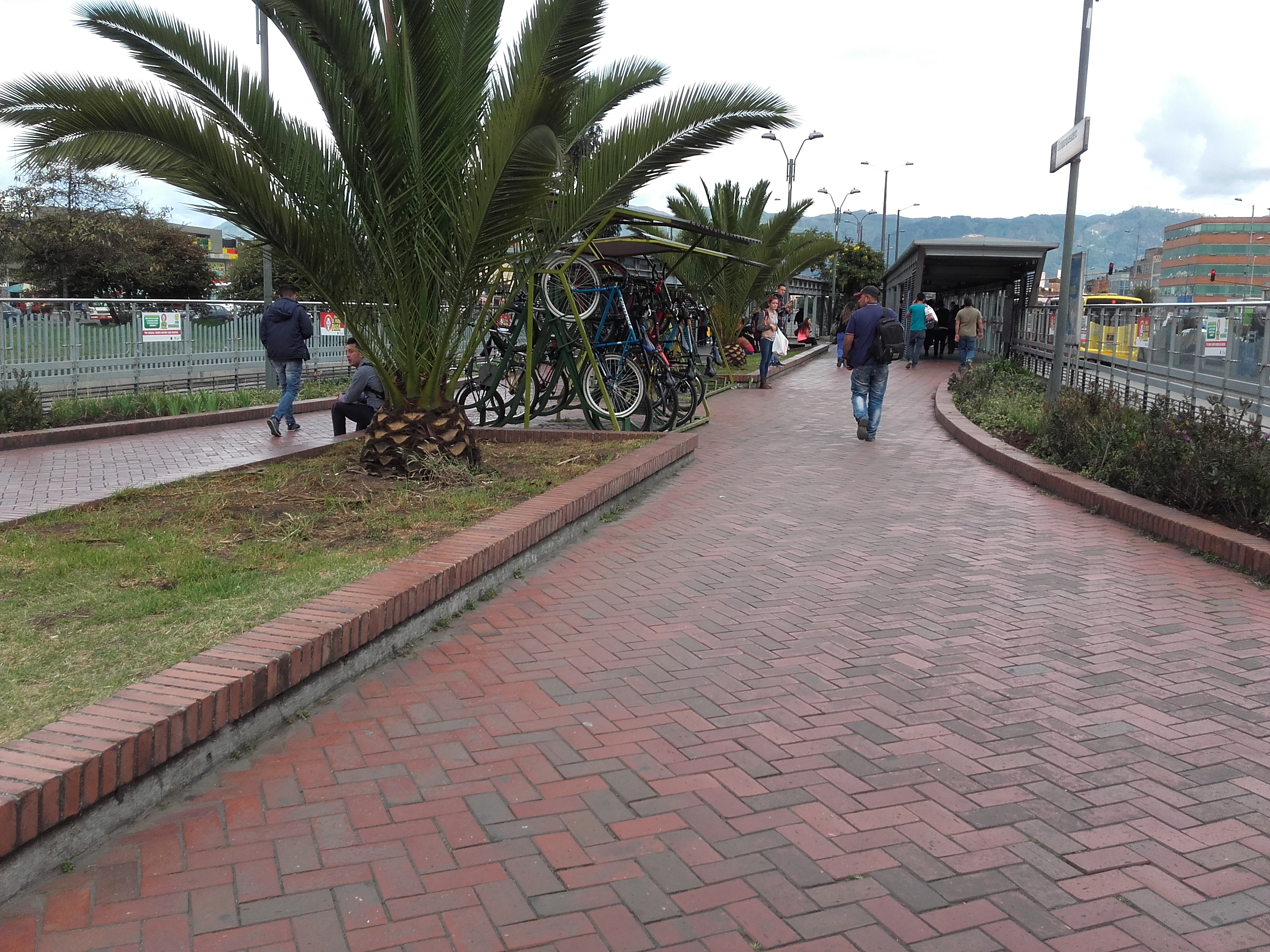
Pradera (TransMilenio)

== History ==
In 2003 and 2004, the Las Américas line was extended from Distrito Grafiti to Transversal 86, including this station.

The station receives its name from the neighborhood located on the southern side of Avenida de Las Américas.

== Station services ==
=== Old trunk services ===
Services rendered until April 29, 2006
Kind	Routes	Frequency
Current		Every 3 minutes on average
Express	Expreso 100 Expreso 170	Every 2 minutes on average

=== Main line service ===
Service as of April 29, 2006
Type	North or East Routes	Western Routes	Frequency
Local	5	5	Every three minutes
Express Monday through Saturday; All day	B14 / M51	F14 / F51	Every two minutes
Express Sundays and holidays	C91	F91	Every 3-4 minutes

=== Feeder routes ===
This station does not have connections to feeder routes.

=== Inter-city service ===
This station does not have inter-city service.

== See also ==
- Bogotá
- TransMilenio
- List of TransMilenio Stations
