= Ricaurte (TransMilenio) =

Bus station in Bogotá, Colombia

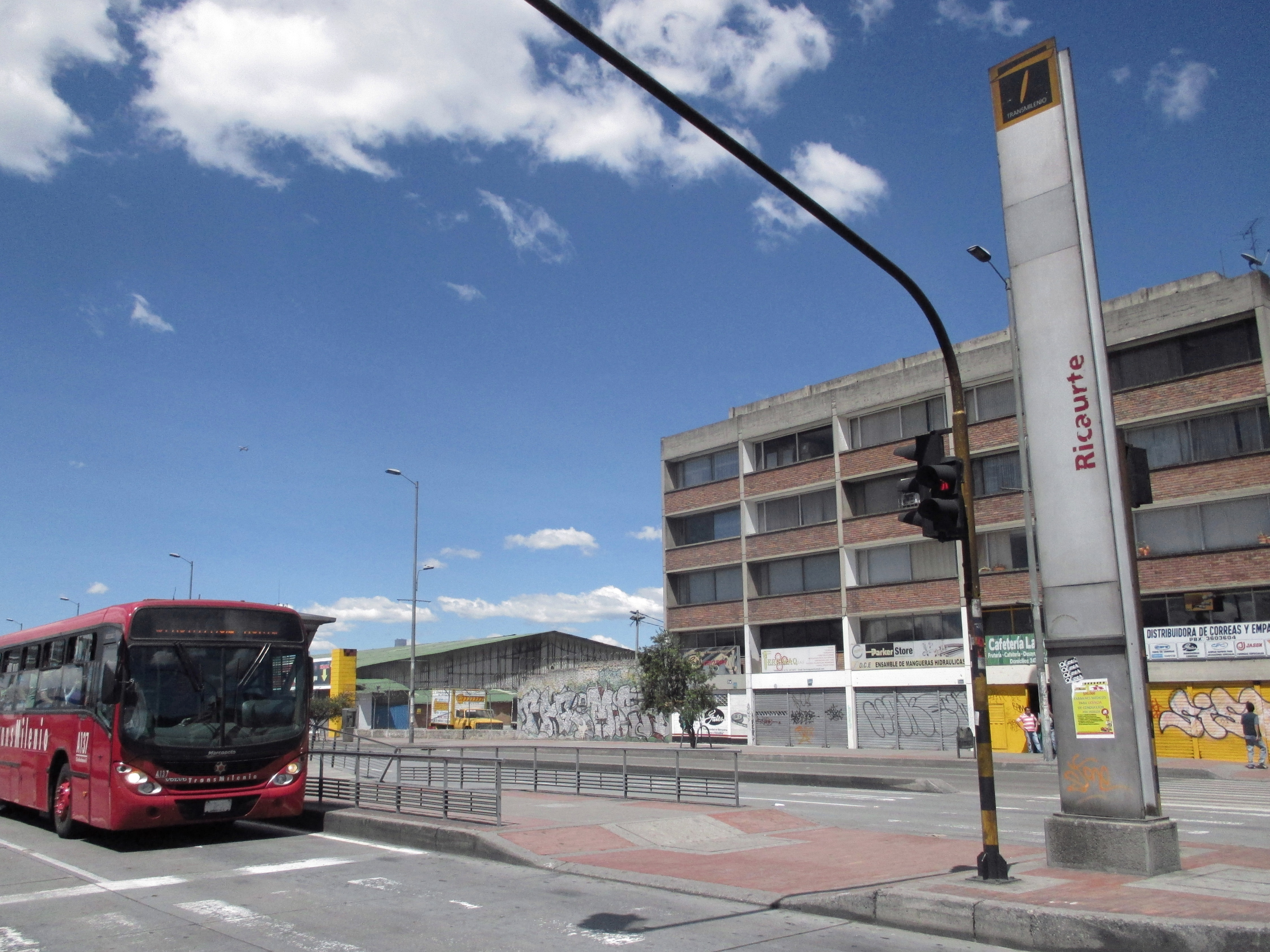

General information
- Location: Troncal Calle 13 between Carreras 27 and 29 and Avenida NQS between Calles 9 and 12. Los Mártires; Colombia

History
- Opened: August 2003

Services
Preceding station	TransMilenio	Following station
San Façon Carrera 22 towards Avenida Jiménez	F	CDS Carrera 32 towards Portal de Las Américas
Paloquemao towards La Castellana	E	Guatoque - Veraguas towards Tygua - San José
Terminus	G	Comuneros towards San Mateo

The transfer station Ricaurte is part of the TransMilenio mass-transit system of Bogotá, Colombia, opened in the year 2000.

== Location ==
The station is located near downtown Bogotá, specifically at the intersection of Calle 13 with Carrera 27, right before the Carrera 30 bridge.

== History ==
The station was opened in 2003 during the opening of the Américas-Calle 13 line. At the end of that same year, one side of the station was closed for the construction of a tunnel connection to the median of Avenida NQS. That portion was opened in 2005.

The station has three entrances: at the traffic light on Avenida Calle 13 with Carrera 27, by the pedestrian bridge located on Avenida NQS with Calle 10, and through the building on the plaza located at the intersection of NQS with Calle 13.

The station is named Ricaurte due to the proximity of the neighborhood with the same name.

It is one of the two stations in the entire system that is part of more than one zone: zones Américas and NQS Central.

== Station Services ==
=== Old trunk services ===
Services rendered until April 29, 2006
Kind	Routes	Frequency
Current		Every 3 minutes on average
Express	Expreso 80 Expreso 120 Expreso 130 Expreso 160 Expreso 170	Every 2 minutes on average
Express Dominical	Expreso Dominical 45	Every 3 or 4 minutes on average

=== Main line service ===
Service as of April 29, 2006
Type	Routes to the North	Routes to the East	Routes to the South	Routes to the West
Avenida NQS wagons
Local	4 7		4 7	
Express Every Day; All day	B12 D22		G43	K43
Express Monday to Saturday; All day	B11		G11	
Express Monday to Friday; All day	C30		C30	
Express Saturday from 5:00 a.m. to 3:00 p.m.	C30		C30	
Avenida Calle 13 wagons
Local		5		5
Express Every Day; All day	B14 C19	J23		F14 F19 F23
Express Monday to Saturday; All day		M51		F51

== See also ==
- Bogotá
- TransMilenio
- List of TransMilenio Stations
