= Patio Bonito (TransMilenio) =

Bus stop in Bogotá, Colombia

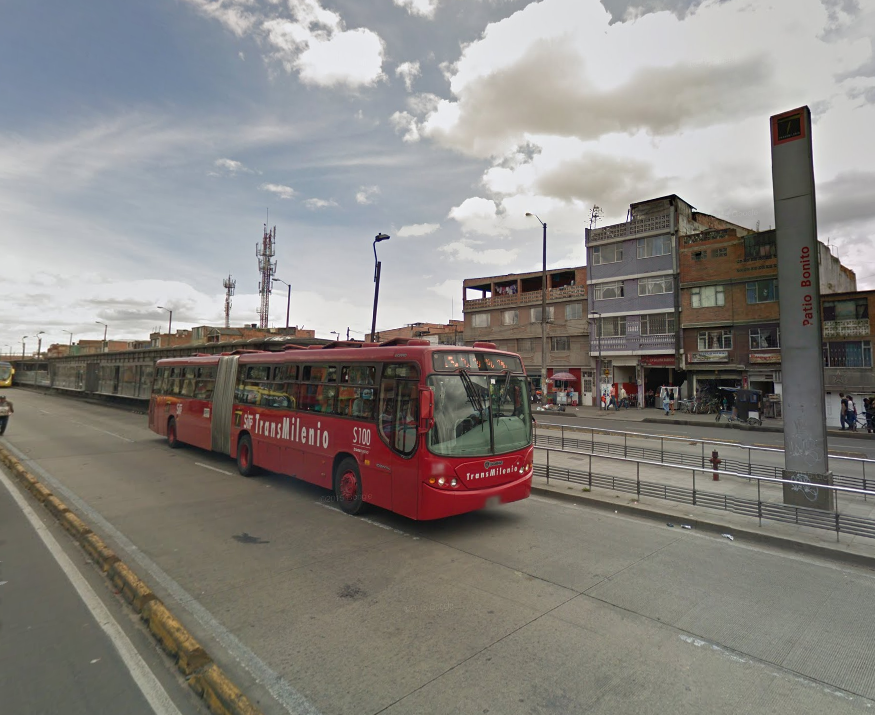

General information
- Location: Kennedy, Bogotá; Colombia

History
- Opened: June 2004

Services
| Preceding station | TransMilenio | Following station |
|---|---|---|
| Biblioteca Tintal towards Avenida Jiménez | F | Portal de Las Américas Terminus |

The simple station Patio Bonito is part of the TransMilenio mass-transit system of Bogotá, Colombia, which opened in the year 2000.

== Location ==
The station is located in southwestern Bogotá, specifically on Avenida Ciudad de Cali with Calles 38 and 40B Sur.

It serves the El Amparo, Corabastos, Mirador de Patio Bonito, and Patio Bonito II neighborhoods.

== History ==
In May 2004, the Avenida de Las Américas line was extended along Avenida Ciudad de Cali. This station was included in that extension.

The station is named Patio Bonito due to the neighborhood of the same name to its west.

== Station services ==
=== Old trunk services ===
Services rendered until April 29, 2006
| Kind | Routes | Frequency |
|---|---|---|
| Current | | Every 3 minutes on average |
| Express | Expreso 120 | Every 2 minutes on average |

=== Main line service ===
Service as of April 29, 2006
| Type | North or East Routes | Western Routes | Frequency |
|---|---|---|---|
| Local | 5 | 5 | Every three minutes |
| Express Monday through Saturday; All day | J23 / M51 | F23 / F51 | Every two minutes |
| Express Monday through Friday; Mixed service, rush and non-rush | A61 | F61 | Every two minutes |
| Express Monday through Friday; Morning rush | B26 | | Every 5 minutes |

== See also ==
- Bogotá
- TransMilenio
- List of TransMilenio stations
