= Biblioteca Tintal (TransMilenio) =

Bus stop in Bogotá, Colombia

General information
- Location: Kennedy, Bogotá; Colombia

History
- Opened: May 2004

Services
Preceding station	TransMilenio	Following station
Transversal 86 towards Avenida Jiménez	F	Patio Bonito towards Portal de Las Américas
Location

The simple station Biblioteca Tintal is part of the TransMilenio mass-transit system of Bogotá, Colombia, which opened in the year 2000.

== Location ==
The station is located in southwestern Bogotá, specifically on Avenida Ciudad de Cali with Calles 1B and 33 Sur.

It serves the María Paz and Tairona neighborhoods. The Tintal Plaza shopping center is located nearby.

== History ==
In May 2004, the Avenida de Las Américas line was extended along Avenida Ciudad de Cali. This station was included in that extension.

The station is named Biblioteca Tintal due to its proximity to one of the city's mega-libraries, located on the site of a former factory. This station has a "Punto de Encuentro" or meeting point, which has restrooms, a coffee shop, a parking for bicycles and an attention booth for tourists.

== Station services ==
=== Old trunk services ===
Services rendered until April 29, 2006
Kind	Routes	Frequency
Current		Every 3 minutes on average
Express	Expreso 100	Every 2 minutes on average
Express Dominical	Expreso Dominical 45	Every 3 or 4 minutes on average

=== Main line service ===
Service as of April 29, 2006
Type	North or East Routes	Western Routes	Frequency
Local	5	5	Every three minutes
Express Monday through Saturday; All day	B14 / M51	F14 / F51	Every two minutes
Express Monday through Saturday; Morning rush	B52		Every two minutes
Express Monday through Friday; Mixed service, rush and non-rush	B28 / C29	F28 / F29	Every two minutes
Express Sundays and holidays	C91	F91	Every 3-4 minutes

=== Feeder routes ===
This station does not have connections to feeder routes.

=== Inter-city service ===
This station does not have inter-city service.

== See also ==
- Bogotá
- TransMilenio
- List of TransMilenio stations
