= Techo =

Techo may refer to:

- TECHO, an anti-poverty organization in Latin America, also known as Un Techo para mi País (literally in Spanish: "A Roof for my Country")
- Techo, Bogotá, a neighbourhood (barrio) of Bogotá, in Colombia
  - Techo (wetland), a wetland of Bogotá, located in the neighbourhood Techo
  - Techo International Airport (Colombia), the first airport in Bogotá, in operation from 1930 to 1959
- Techo International Airport, Cambodia

== See also ==
- Hobonichi Techo, a Japanese brand of daily planner
