= Puente Aranda =

- Locality of Bogotá
- Location of the locality in the city of Bogotá

- Location of the locality in the Capital District of Bogotá
- Coordinates: 4°36′45″N 74°06′24″W
- Country: Colombia
- City: Bogotá D.C.

Area
  - Total: 17.31 km^{2} (6.68 sq mi)
- Elevation: 2,600 m (8,500 ft)

Population (2007)
  - Total: 250,715
  - Density: 14,480/km^{2} (37,510/sq mi)
- Time zone: UTC-5 (Colombia Standard Time)
- Website: Official website

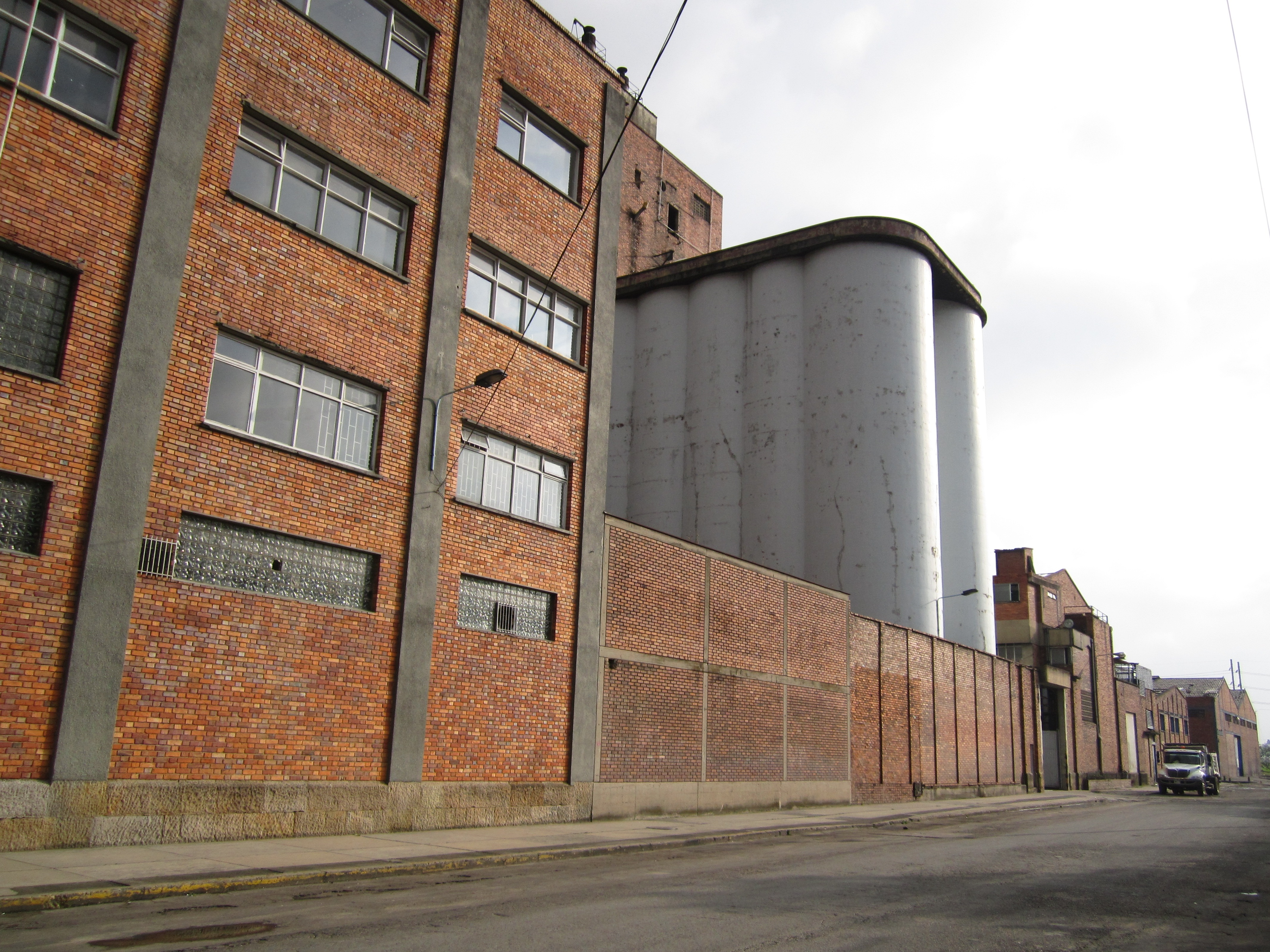
Andina Brewery in Puente Aranda

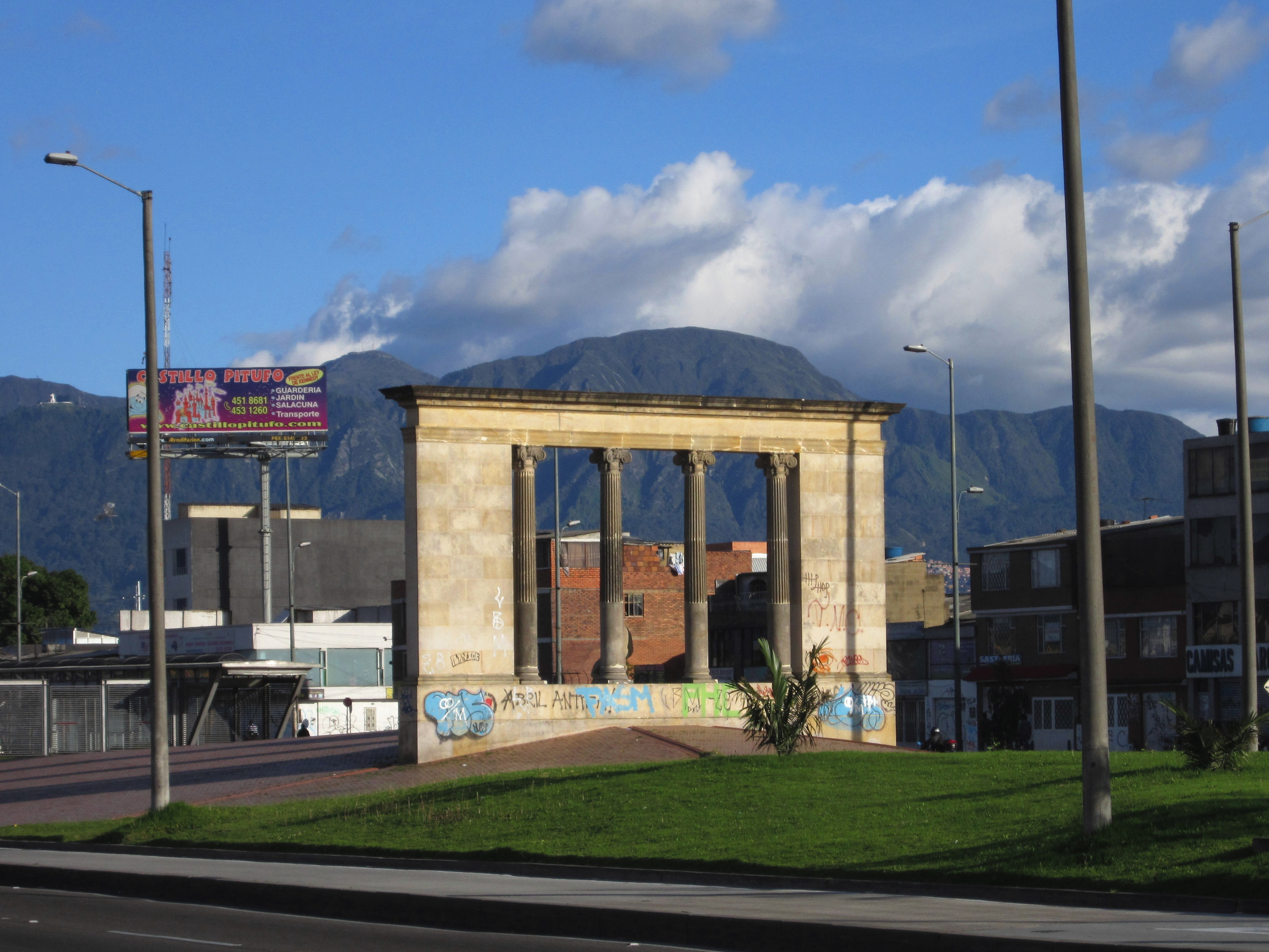
Monument to Sié (water) along the Avenida de Las Américas

Puente Aranda is the 16th location of the Capital District of the Colombian capital city, Bogotá. It is located in the center part of Bogotá. This district is mostly inhabited by lower middle and working class residents. The district was named after an old bridge in the hacienda of Juan Aranda over the "Chinúa River", now called the San Francisco River, that dates to the 16th century. Puente Aranda has 1,724 hectares (4,260 acres) of area which are almost entirely urban. This locality has more than 300,000 inhabitants, 5% of the total urban area inhabitants of Bogota.

== Geography ==
To the north, the locality of Puente Aranda borders Calle 19, which serves as boundary with the locality of Teusaquillo. To the south Puente Aranda borders the Autopista Sur and the localities of Tunjuelito and Antonio Nariño, to the east with the main avenue Norte-Quito-Sur and the locality of Los Mártires. To the west, Puente Aranda borders the Avenida Carrera 68 and the localities of Kennedy and Fontibón.

Puente Aranda was in the past a convergence of many streams and wetlands on the Bogotá savanna. It suffered frequent floodings, in contrast with the now almost entirely urbanized flat area with a slight increase in elevation from east to west.

The Fucha River, the San Cristobal River and the "Canal de los Comuneros" crosses the locality among other canalized streams like Seco River, La Albania River, and the San Francisco River.

== History ==
=== Colonial and Postcolonial ===
The Puente Aranda hacienda was property of Don Jorge Aranda, and was established in a marshy terrain south of the then village of Santafé in the 16th century by the oidor Francisco de Anuncibay who arrived to the New Kingdom of Granada in the year 1537. This hacienda was first named "Hacienda of Aranda" and "The Roof of the Jorges", where the rivers Chinúa and San Agustín merged. It was also the main western path to get to the Magdalena River, which was and still is the most important fluvial artery of Colombia and a bridge was built to facilitate this. Floodings of the Bogotá River and its tributaries was frequent. In 1768, a bridge was reconstructed with a better structure and named Puente de Aranda (Aranda's Bridge). Then, an esplanade was built along across the wetlands, towards the west in an effort to connect Bogotá with the port of Honda along the Magdalena River. This way, Honda was then connected to Fontibón and the "Avenida de Encomienda", nowadays Calle 13 (Avenida del Centenario). Simón Bolívar and his troops camped in the Hacienda of Aranda in 1814 during the wars of independence from Spain.

In 1898 the southern line of the Railway of Bogotá was established which connected Bogota with the Tequendama Falls area as part of the development of the region. The area was until the beginning of the 20th century a rural area of many haciendas.

=== Urbanization ===
By 1944, the rapid expansion of Bogotá towards the south reached the Puente Aranda area, the Aranda bridge was demolished to build Avenida de Las Américas, a project supported by the Colombian Society of Architects, which would join Calle 13 and dividing into two ways; Calle 13 towards Fontibón and Avenida de Las Américas towards the locality of Kennedy. The area where these two ways intersect is the site of the new Aranda bridge and the name of the neighborhood of Puente Aranda surrounding the crossing.

The area then had a rapid residential and industrial development, with numerous small manufacturing businesses basing their operations in the area. Puente Aranda was zonified and consolidated with the Pilot Plan for Bogotá in 1951. In 1963, Puente Aranda and its neighboring barrios were declared sectors of Bogota only after Chapinero which had been named a zone in 1954. Since then, Puente Aranda has been producing industrial products as textiles, chemicals, metallurgy, food and services.

Puente Aranda then extended to conurbate with the localities of Fontibón and Kennedy to the west, and Antonio Nariño and Rafael Uribe Uribe to the south.

In 1972, the "Special District of Bogotá" was created and divided the city into 16 zones, each of them served by a minor city hall. This was done in an effort to begin establishing a Metropolitan Area for Bogotá. The 16 mayors, heading the different zones, were appointed by the Mayor of Bogotá. This system was ratified in an agreement in the year 1977.

With the Colombian Constitution of 1991, the Special District became the Capital District dividing Bogotá into 20 localities and its minor city hall became a local city hall with its city council and a local administrative board.

== Demography ==
The locality has an increasing rhythm of development which by the year 2000 had 1794 city blocks, 700 of these industrial and some 800 residential. There are five relatively important neighborhoods considered Units of Zone Planification:

- Ciudad Montes
- San Rafael
- Muzu
- Puente Aranda
- Corridor Industrial

=== Population ===
The first census was done in 1973, in which Puente Aranda had an estimated population of 221,776 inhabitants. In the 1985 Census Puente Aranda registered a population of 305,123 inhabitants and since then the population started to decrease due to the construction of new residential areas in other parts of Bogotá. In 1993, Puente Aranda registered a population of 282,491 inhabitants. According to the 2005 Census, Puente Aranda had grown to 370,292 inhabitants.

== Transportation ==
Puente Aranda is surrounded by the Avenida Carrera 68, the Carrera 30, the Avenida de Las Américas, Calle 13, Calle 19, Calle 3, Calle 6 and Carrera 50, which are its most important roads. It also includes a section over the Avenida Primero de Mayo, all these streets are covered by different bus routes which connect Puente Aranda to the rest of the city.

The locality is also served by the bus rapid transit system TransMilenio, with multiple stops on the F and G lines; Marsella, Pradera, Distrito Grafiti, Puente Aranda, Carrera 43, Industrial Zone and CDS Carrera 32.

At Carrera 53, there is a satellite stop that covers intermunicipal routes through Fontibón and the rest of the Metropolitan Area of Bogotá to the municipalities of Funza, Mosquera, Madrid and others. The area is also covered by the Bogota's Bike Paths Network.

== Neighbourhoods ==
The most important neighbourhoods of Puente Aranda are: Tibana, Puente Aranda, Pensilvania, Comuneros, Primavera, El Jazmín, Jorge Gaitán Cortés, Santa Matilde, Ciudad Montes, La Guaca, El Remanso, La Ponderosa, La Alquería, La Coruña, Ospina Pérez, Muzu, Galán, La Asunción, Bochica Sur, Pradera, Milenta, Trinidad Galán, La Igualdad, San Rafael, San Rafael Industrial, Salazár Gómez, Veraguas, Veraguas Central, Gorgonzola, La Camelia, Tejar, Santa Rita, Vosconia, Torremolinos, El Ejido, Santa Isabel, Colón, San Gabriel and Sorrento. Furthermore, the Industrial Corridor includes the Industrial Zone, the Industrial Center and the Centennial Industrial Zone.
