= Museo del Oro (TransMilenio) =

Transit station in Bogota, Colombia

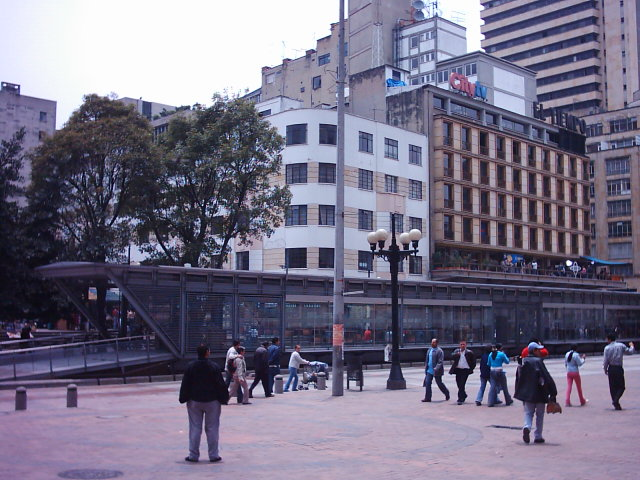

General information
- Location: Avenida Jiménez between Carreras 6 and 7 La Candelaria
- Line(s): Eje Ambiental
- Platforms: 1

History
- Opened: June, 2002

Services
Preceding station	TransMilenio	Following station
Las Aguas Terminus	J	Avenida Jiménez Terminus

Museo del Oro is a bus station. It is part of the TransMilenio mass-transit system of Bogotá, Colombia, opened in the year 2000.

== Location ==
The station is located in the very heart of Bogotá. It is located on Avenida Jiménez just five meters from Carrera Séptima. The station is situated between the television studios of Citytv to the south and the headquarters of Banco de la República to the north. Also nearby is the Iglesia de San Francisco (to the west), the Plazoleta del Rosario and the Universidad del Rosario

== History ==
The Eje Ambiental line of the TransMilenio was opened in 2002, which include Las Aguas, Avenida Jiménez, and this station.

The station is named for the Museo del Oro, which is located 150 meters away.

== Station services ==
=== Old trunk services ===
Services rendered until April 29, 2006
Kind	Routes	Frequency
Express	Expreso 10 Expreso 120	Every 2 minutes on average
Super Express	Expreso 400	Every 2 minutes on average
Express Dominical	Expreso Dominical 35	Every 3 or 4 minutes on average

=== Main line service ===
Service as of April 29, 2006
Type	Northern Routes	Southern Routes
Express Monday through Saturday; All day	F23	J23
Express Monday through Saturday; Morning rush		J70
Express Monday through Saturday; Evening rush	B74	J72

Note: the station does not provide service on Sundays and holidays.

=== Feeder routes ===
This station does not have connections to feeder routes.

=== Inter-city service ===
This station does not have inter-city service.

== See also ==
- Bogotá
- TransMilenio
- List of TransMilenio Stations
