= Techo (wetland) =

Wetland in Bogotá, Colombia

Techo Wetland Humedal del Techo
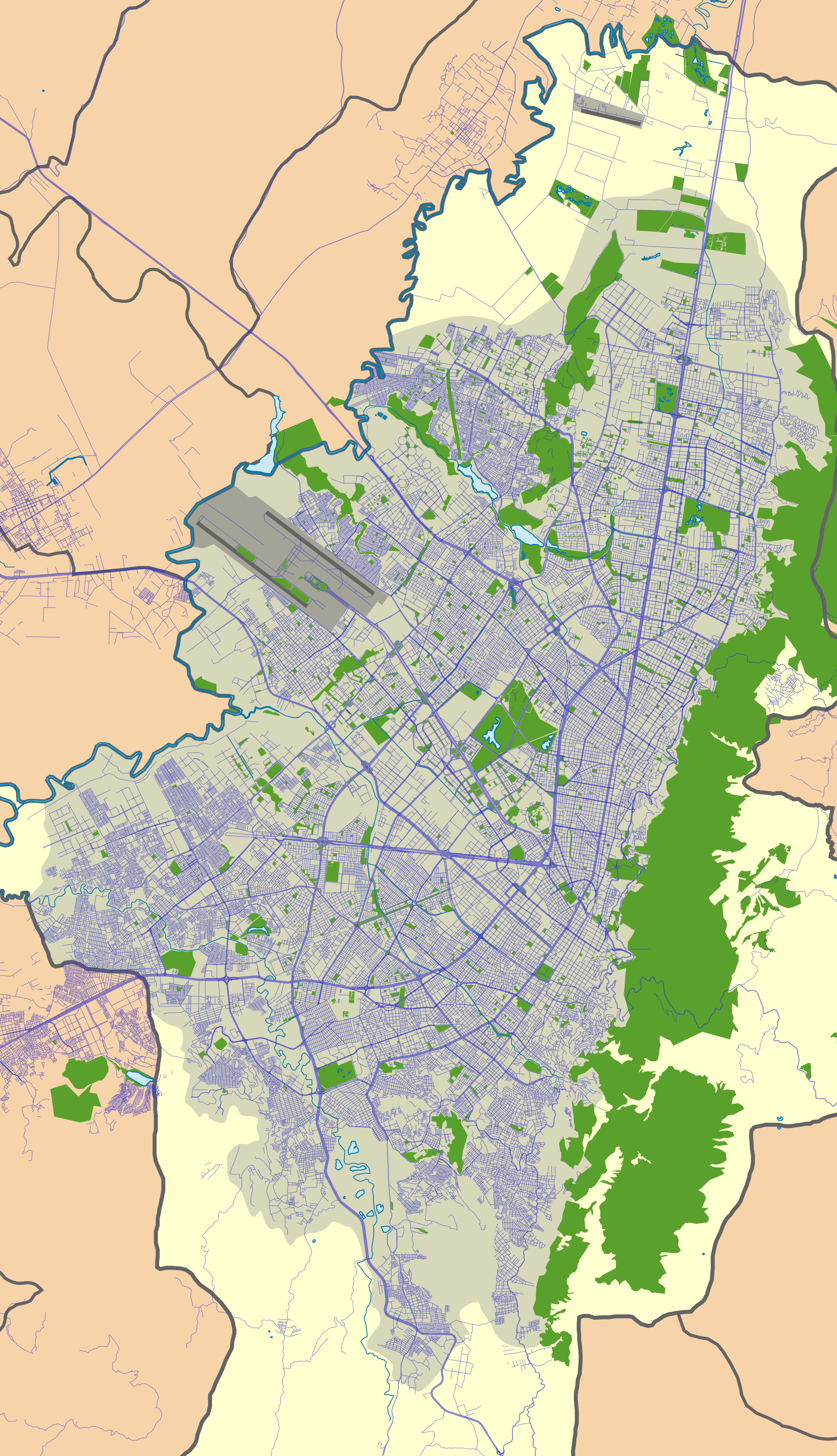
- Location within Bogotá
- Location: Techo, Kennedy, Bogotá; Colombia
- Coordinates: 4°38′53.0″N 74°08′35.0″W
- Area: 11.67 ha (28.8 acres)
- Elevation: 2,544.8 m (8,349 ft)
- Designated: September 2003
- Named for: Muysccubun: cacique Techovita
- Administrator: EAAB - ESP

Techo (Spanish: Humedal del Techo) is a wetland, part of the Wetlands of Bogotá, located in the neighbourhood Techo in the locality Kennedy, Bogotá, Colombia. The wetland on the Bogotá savanna covers an area of about 11.6 hectares (29 acres). Techo is located in the basins of the Bogotá River and its main tributaries Fucha and Tunjuelo.

== Etymology ==
The name Techo is taken from Techovita, the name of a cacique in the Muisca Confederation, the former country on the Altiplano Cundiboyacense before the Spanish conquest.

== Flora and fauna ==
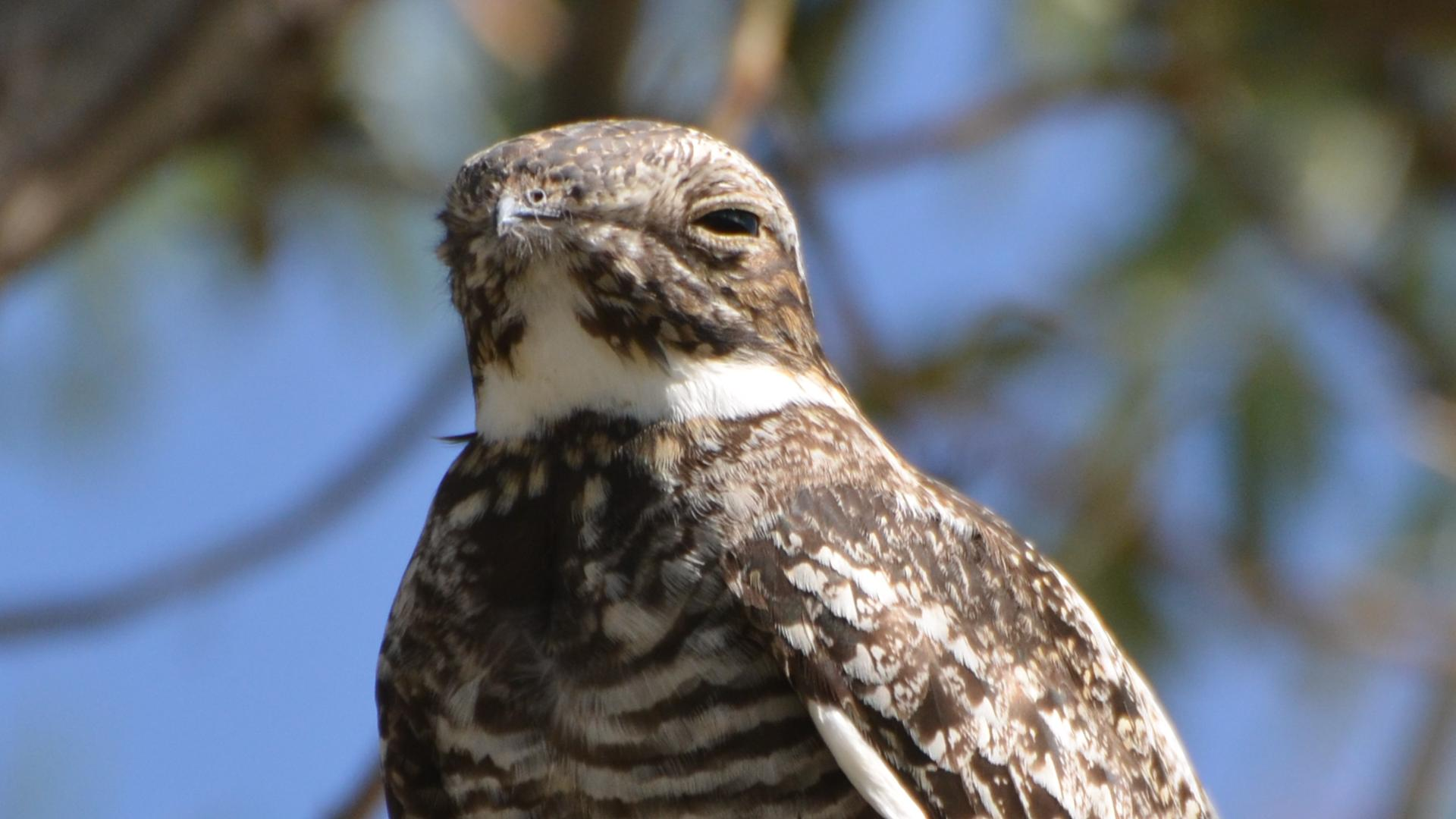
The common nighthawk is in the wetlands of Bogotá uniquely registered in Techo

=== Flora ===
Flora registered in Techo are among others Hydrocotyle ranunculoides, Lemna minor, Typha latifolia and Juncus bogotensis.

=== Birds ===
In Techo, 53 bird species have been registered, of which one endemic, uniquely to this wetland, the common nighthawk (Chordeiles minor.

Other bird species as the yellow-hooded blackbird (Chrysomus icterocephalus bogotensis), great crested flycatcher (Myiarchus crinitus) and black flowerpiercer (Diglossa humeralis) have been spotted in Techo.

== See also ==
- Biodiversity of Colombia, Bogotá savanna, Thomas van der Hammen Natural Reserve
- Wetlands of Bogotá
