= Las Aguas (TransMilenio) =

TransMilenio station in Bogotá, Colombia

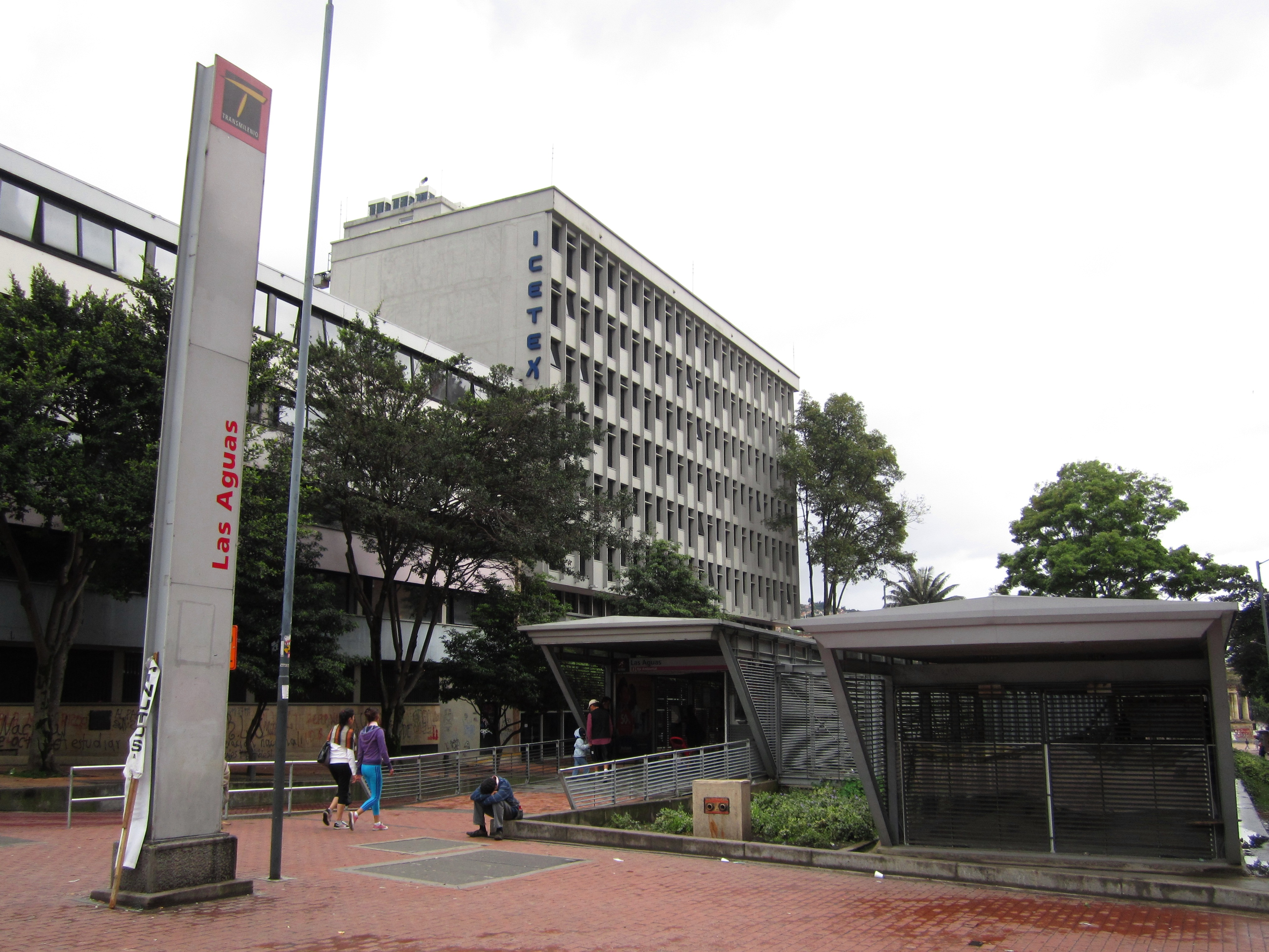

General information
- Location: Carrera 3 with Calles 18 and 19; La Candelaria
- Line: Eje Ambiental
- Platforms: 1

History
- Opened: June, 2002

Services
Preceding station	TransMilenio	Following station
Universidades towards Las Aguas	J	Museo del Oro towards Avenida Jiménez
Location

Las Aguas is a station on the TransMilenio mass-transit system of Bogotá, Colombia.

== Location ==
The station is located in the eastern part of downtown Bogotá, specifically on the Avenida Jiménez extension, Carrera 3 with Calles 18 and 19.

== History ==
The Eje Ambiental line of the TransMilenio was opened in 2002, which include Museo del Oro, Avenida Jiménez, and this station.

The station is named Aguas due to the church and neighborhood of the same name located in the area.

This station has a "Punto de Encuentro" or point of gathering, which has bathrooms, coffeeshop, parking for bicycles and a tourist attention booth.

== Station Services ==
=== Old trunk services ===
Services rendered until April 29, 2006
Kind	Routes	Frequency
Express	Expreso 10 Expreso 120	Every 2 minutes on average
Super Express	Expreso 400	Every 2 minutes on average
Express Dominical	Expreso Dominical 35	Every 3 or 4 minutes on average

=== Main line service ===
Service as of April 29, 2006
Type	Northern Route	Western Route
Express Monday through Saturday; All day		F23
Express Monday through Saturday; Evening rush	B74	
Ending routes
Express Monday through Saturday; All day	J23	
Express Monday through Saturday; Morning rush	J70	
Express Monday through Saturday; Peak hour in the afternoon	J72	

Note: the station does not provide service on Sundays and holidays.

=== Complementary routes ===
The following complementary route also works:

- 18.3 Circular Germania - Carrera Séptima - Tibabitá (Usaquén).

=== Inter-city service ===
This station does not have inter-city service.

== See also ==
- Bogotá
- TransMilenio
- List of TransMilenio Stations
