= Tintal, Bogotá =

Tintal
- Barrio
- Country: Colombia
- Department: Distrito Capital
- City: Bogotá

Tintal is a neighbourhood (barrio) of Bogotá, Colombia, in the locality of Kennedy.
