= Techo, Bogotá =

Techo
- Barrio
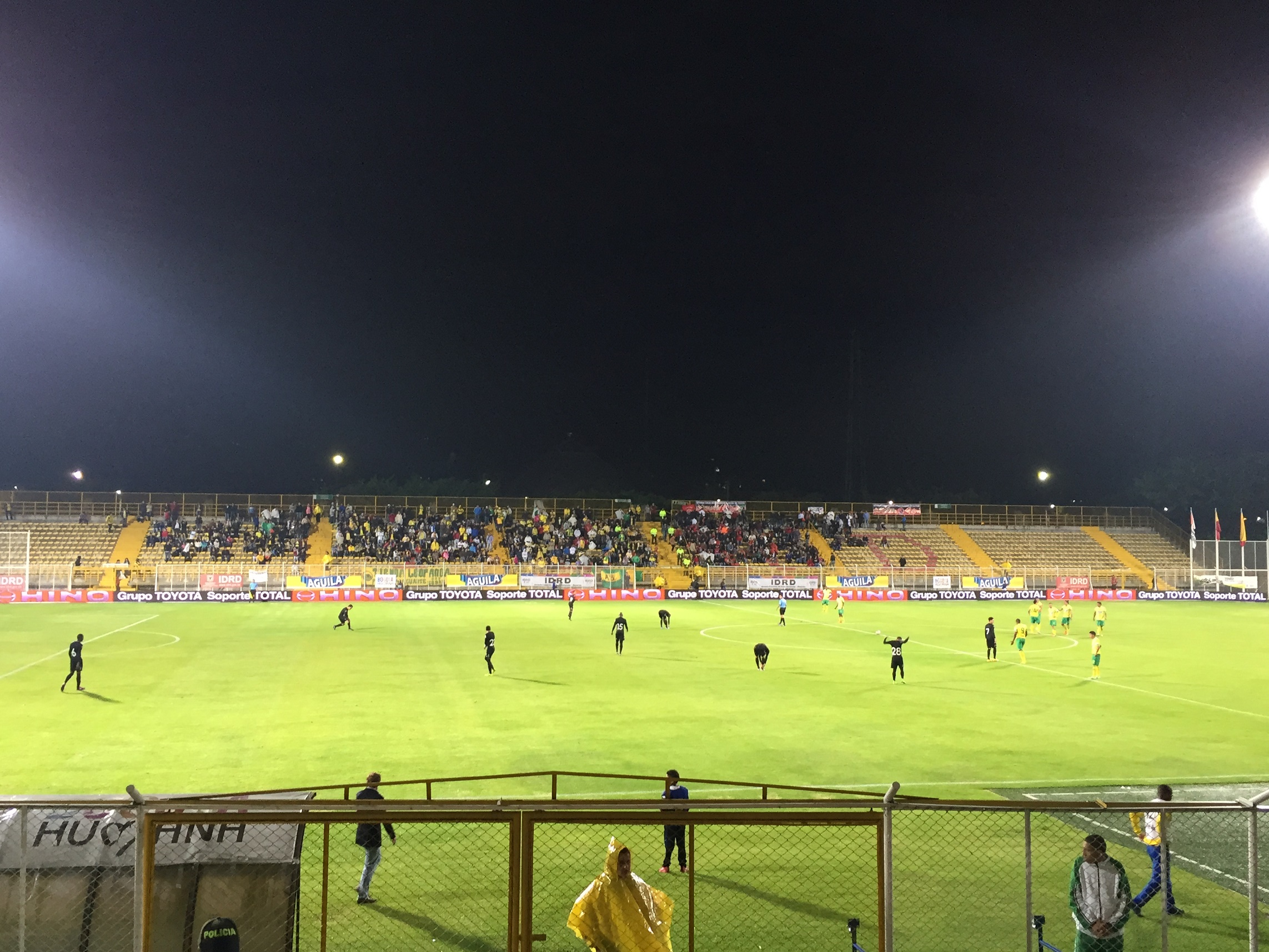
- Estadio Metropolitano de Techo
- Etymology: Muysccubun: Techitina
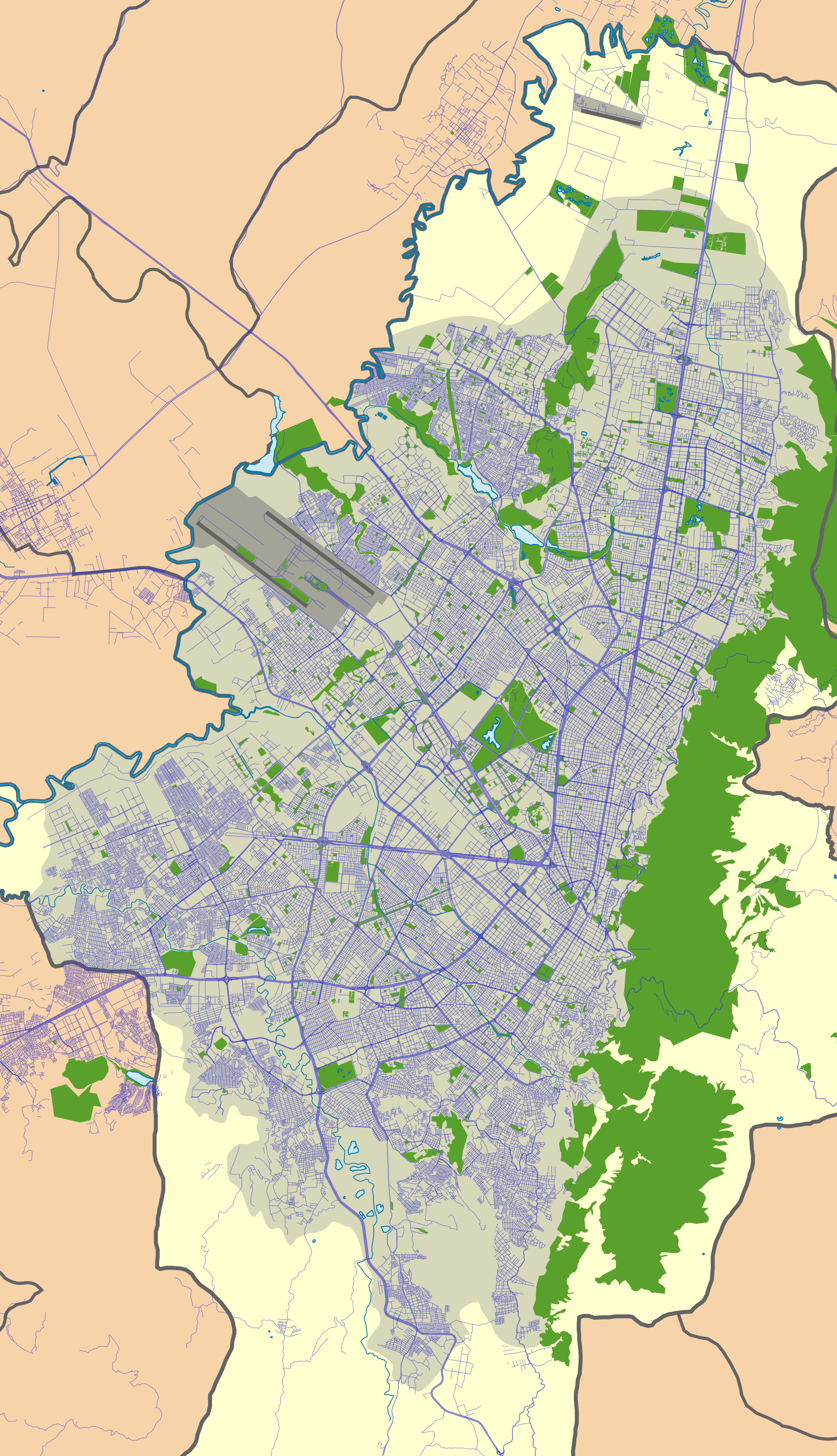
- Location in Bogotá
- Coordinates: 4°38′53″N 74°08′35″W
- Country: Colombia
- Department: Distrito Capital
- City: Bogotá
- Locality: Kennedy
- Elevation: 2,545 m (8,350 ft)
- Time zone: UTC-5 (Colombia Standard Time)

Techo is a neighbourhood (barrio) of Bogotá, Colombia, part of the locality Kennedy. It contains a wetland of the same name, part of the Wetlands of Bogotá, Colombia. The wetland covers about 11 hectares (27 acres).

== Etymology ==
The name Techo comes from the Muisca cacique Techitina who ruled the area of Techo before the Spanish conquest of the Muisca.

== History ==
The central highlands of Colombia, the Altiplano Cundiboyacense and its southwestern part the Bogotá savanna, was inhabited since 10,000 years BP. The geography of the region is dominated by numerous humedales; wetlands. They form part of the remains of the Lake Humboldt, a Pleistocene lake on the savanna. The Bogotá River flows close to Techo and is another remainder of the lake that disappeared around 30,000 years BP.

In the times before the Spanish conquest, Techo was part of the Muisca Confederation. The zipa of Bacatá ruled over Techo, today part of the capital. Agriculture, the most important source of income and self-sufficiency of the Muisca, was performed around the wetlands.

As part of the campaign of conquistador Gonzalo Jiménez de Quesada, Techo was submitted to the rule of the Spanish Empire in 1538.

In 1919 the construction of Techo Airport was started. The airport was in use between 1930 and 1959 when it was replaced by El Dorado International Airport, the international airport of Bogotá.

== Sports ==
Techo hosts the Estadio Metropolitano de Techo, home base of first division clubs La Equidad and Fortaleza C.E.I.F.

== See also ==
- Tibabuyes
