= Puente Aranda (TransMilenio) =

Bus stop in Bogotá, Colombia

General information
- Location: Puente Aranda; Colombia

History
- Opened: 2003

Services
Preceding station	TransMilenio	Following station
Carrera 43 towards Avenida Jiménez	F	Distrito Grafiti towards Portal de Las Américas

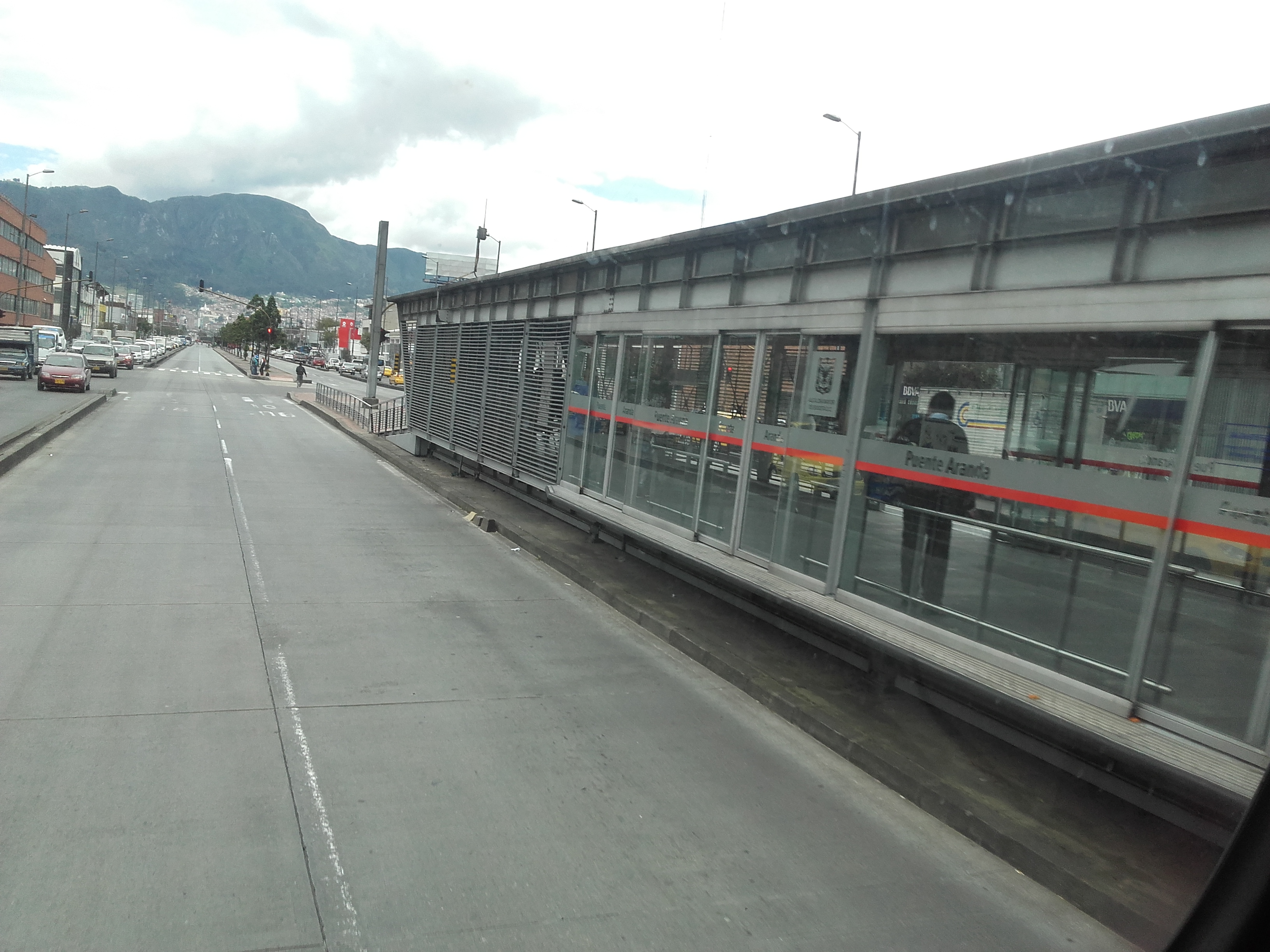

The simple station Puente Aranda, is part of the TransMilenio mass-transit system of Bogotá, Colombia, which opened in the year 2000.

== Location ==
The station is located to the west of downtown Bogotá, specifically on Troncal Calle 13 between Carreras 47 and 49.

== History ==
The station was opened in 2003 after completion of the Calle 13 portion of the Américas line, from De La Sabana to this station.

The station is named Puente Aranda after the industrial locality in which it is located. It is also the common name of a bridge located the west of the station.

== Station services ==
=== Old trunk services ===
Services rendered until April 29, 2006
Kind	Routes	Frequency
Current		Every 3 minutes on average
Express	Expreso 170	Every 2 minutes on average

=== Main line service ===
Service as of April 29, 2006
Type	Northern Routes	Western Routes	Frequency
Local	5	5	Every 3 minutes

=== Feeder routes ===
This station has no feeder routes.

=== Inter-city service ===
This station has no connections to inter-city buses.

== See also ==
- Bogotá
- TransMilenio
- List of TransMilenio Stations
