= De La Sabana (TransMilenio) =

Bus stop in Bogotá, Colombia

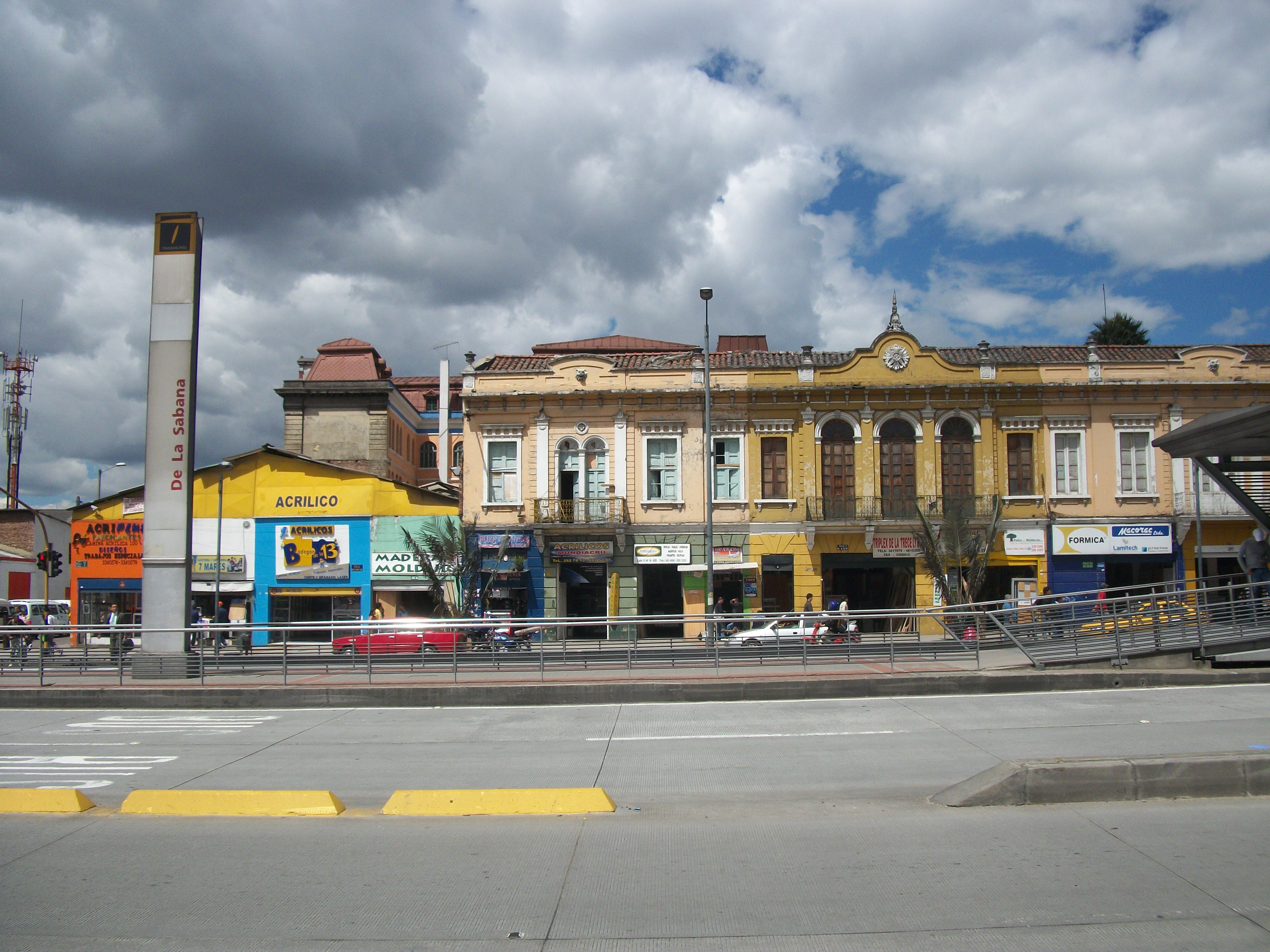

General information
- Location: Troncal Calle 13 between carreras 16 and 17; Los Mártires
- Line(s): Calle 13 - Américas

History
- Opened: November 8, 2003

Services
| Preceding station | TransMilenio | Following station |
|---|---|---|
| Avenida Jiménez Terminus | F | San Façon Carrera 22 towards Portal de Las Américas |

The simple-station De La Sabana is part of the TransMilenio mass-transit system of Bogotá, Colombia, opened in the year 2000.

== Location ==
The station is located close to downtown Bogotá, close to the main train station, De La Sabana, but more specifically on the Troncal Calle 13 between Carreras 16 and 17.

== History ==
The station was opened in 2003 as part of the opening of Main Line Calle 13 from this station to Puente Aranda.

== Station services ==
=== Old trunk services ===
Services rendered until April 29, 2006
| Kind | Routes | Frequency |
|---|---|---|
| Current | | Every 3 minutes on average |
| Express | Expreso 170 | Every 2 minutes on average |

=== Main line service ===
Service as of April 29, 2006
| Type | North Routes | Western Routes |
|---|---|---|
| Local | 5 | 5 |
| Express Monday through Saturday; All day | B14 | F14 |

=== Feeder routes ===
This station does not have connections to feeder routes.

=== Inter-city service ===
This station does not have inter-city service.

== See also ==
- Bogotá
- TransMilenio
- List of TransMilenio Stations
