= Transversal 86 (TransMilenio) =

Bus stop in Bogotá, Colombia

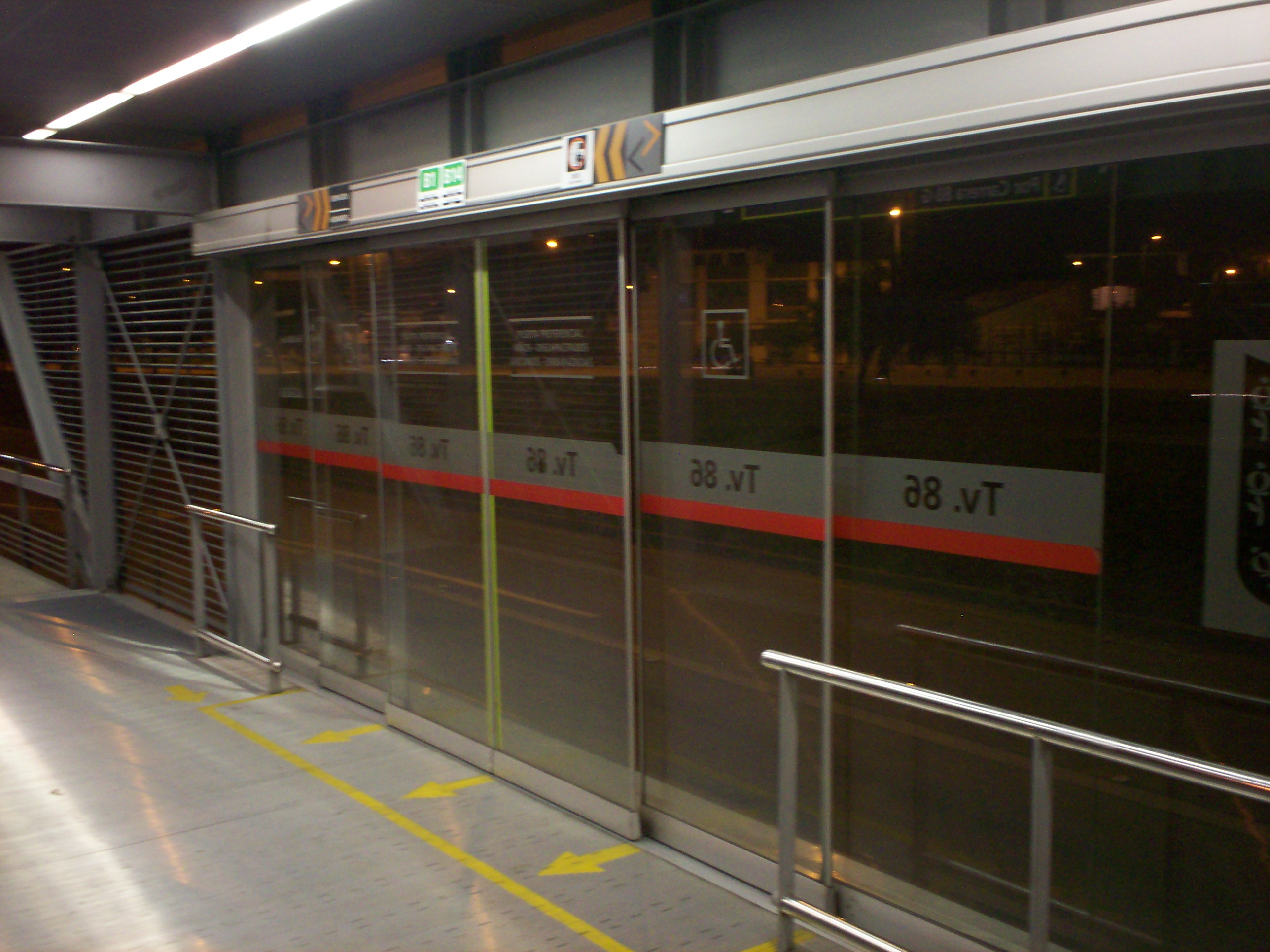

General information
- Location: Kennedy, Bogotá; Colombia

History
- Opened: January 2004

Services
Preceding station	TransMilenio	Following station
Banderas towards Avenida Jiménez	F	Biblioteca Tintal towards Portal de Las Américas

The simple station Transversal 86 is part of the TransMilenio mass-transit system of Bogotá, Colombia, which opened in the year 2000.

== Location ==
The station is located in southwestern Bogotá, specifically on Avenida de Las Américas with Transversal 86.

== History ==
In 2003, the Las Américas line was extended from Distrito Grafiti to this station.

Before the completion of the Avenida Ciudad de Cali extension, buses without route numbers would leave this station with signs reading P.A. or PORTAL AMERICAS to the Portal de Las Américas.

== Station services ==
=== Old trunk services ===
Services rendered until April 29, 2006
Kind	Routes	Frequency
Current		Every 3 minutes on average

=== Main line service ===
Service as of April 29, 2006
Type	North or East Routes	Western Routes	Frequency
Local	5	5	Every three minutes
Express Monday through Saturday; All day	B14	F14	Every two minutes

=== Feeder routes ===
This station does not have connections to feeder routes.

=== Inter-city service ===
This station does not have inter-city service.

== See also ==
- Bogotá
- TransMilenio
- List of TransMilenio stations
