= Carvajal, Bogotá =

Carvajal (Bogotá)
- Barrio
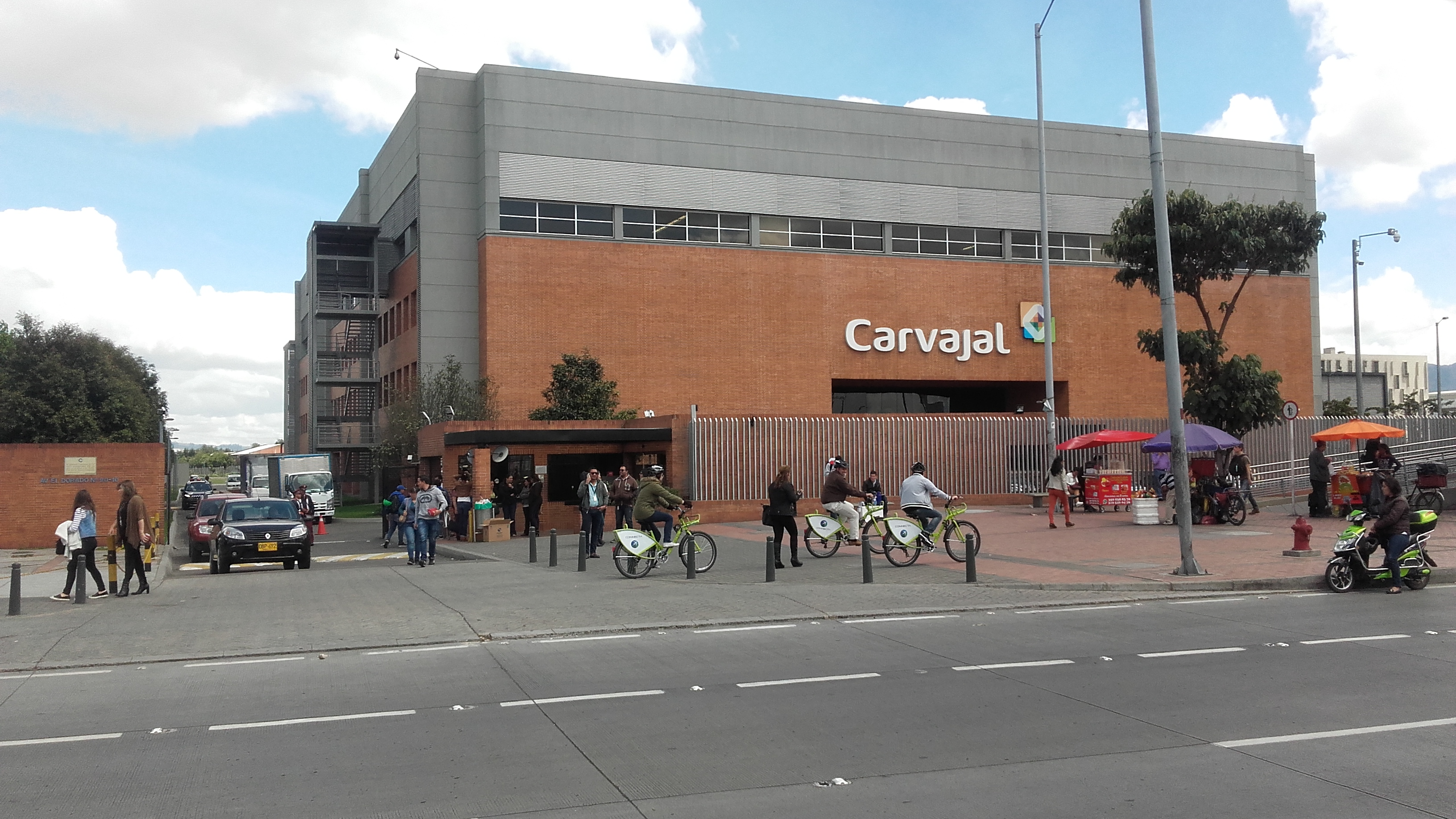
- Interactive map of Carvajal (Bogotá)
- Country: Colombia
- Department: Distrito Capital
- City: Bogotá

Carvajal (Bogotá) is a neighbourhood (barrio) of Bogotá, Colombia.

== History ==
The neighborhood was named after Father Estanislao Carvajal Arbeláez, a Catholic priest who played an important social role in supporting emerging communities in the area. He contributed to organizing local residents and providing the first religious and social services, which made him a symbolic figure in the historical development of the neighborhood.
