= Santa Isabel, Bogotá =

Santa Isabel
- Barrio
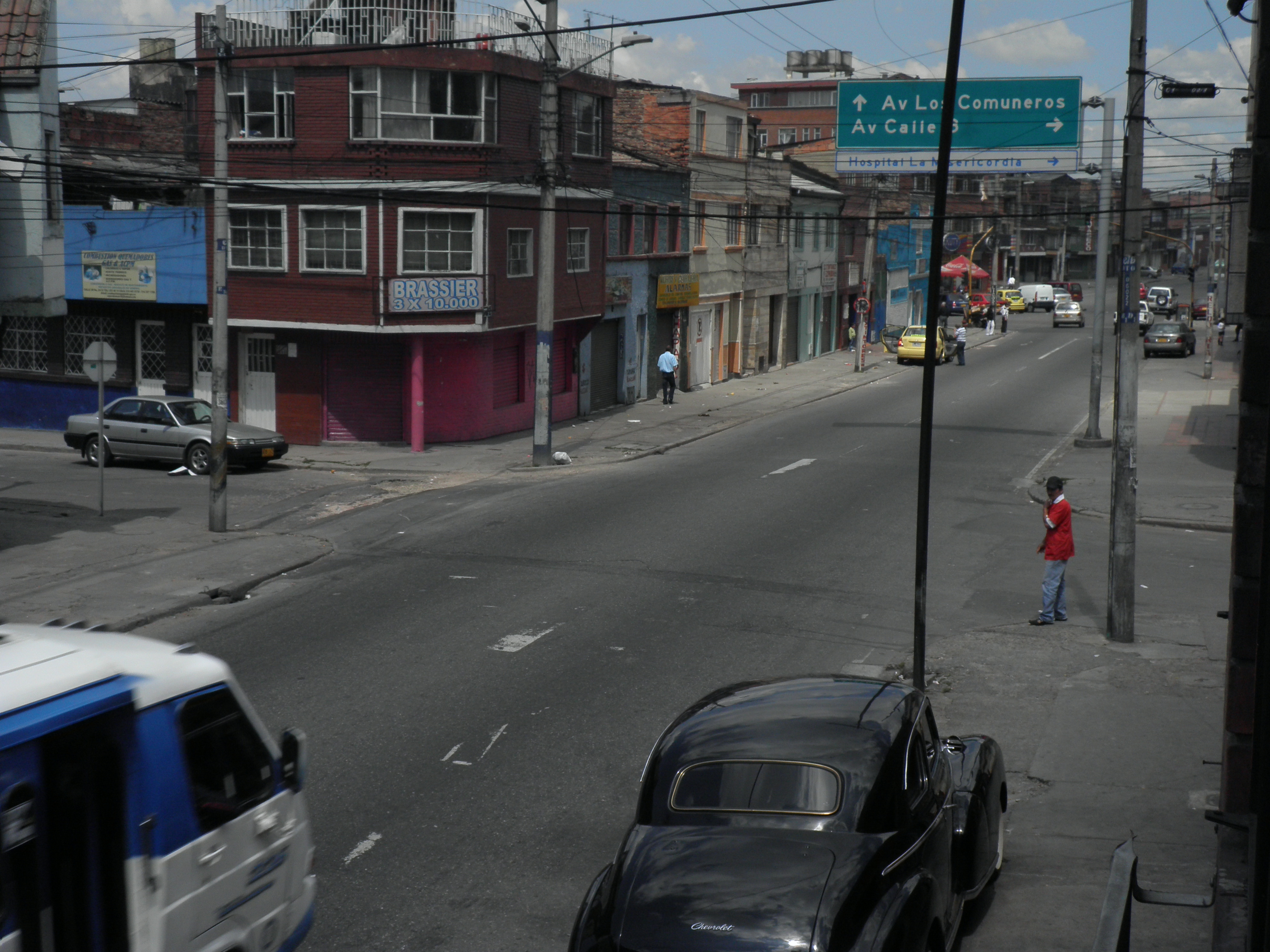
- Santa Isabel neighborhood of Bogotá
- Country: Colombia
- Department: Distrito Capital
- City: Bogotá

Santa Isabel is a neighbourhood (barrio) of Bogotá, Colombia.
