= Distrito Grafiti (TransMilenio) =

Bus station in Bogotá, Colombia

General information
- Location: Avenida de Las Américas with Carrera 53 A in the Grafiti District; Puente Aranda, Bogotá; Colombia

History
- Opened: December 2003

Services
Preceding station	TransMilenio	Following station
Puente Aranda towards Avenida Jiménez	F	Pradera towards Portal de Las Américas

Distrito Grafiti is a station that is part of the TransMilenio mass-transit system of Bogotá, Colombia, which opened in the year 2003.

== Location ==
The station is located in the industrial zone of Bogotá, specifically on Avenida de Las Américas with Carrera 53 A.

It serves the Salazar Gómez, San Rafael, and Puente Aranda neighborhoods.

== History ==
In 2003, the Las Américas line was extended from this station to Transversal 86.

The station was named Américas - Carrera 53 A due to its location at that intersection. Its name changed in November, 2019, to Distrito Grafiti.

== Station Services ==
=== Old trunk services ===
Services rendered until April 29, 2006
Kind	Routes	Frequency
Current		Every 3 minutes on average
Express	Expreso 80	Every 2 minutes on average
Express Dominical	Expreso Dominical 45	Every 3 or 4 minutes on average

=== Main line service ===
Service as of April 29, 2006
Type	North or East Routes	Western Routes	Frequency
Local	5	5	Every three minutes
Express Monday through Saturday; All day	C19 / M51	F19 / F51	Every two minutes

=== Feeder routes ===
This station does not have connections to feeder routes.

=== Inter-city service ===
This station does not have inter-city service.

== See also ==
- Bogotá
- TransMilenio
- List of TransMilenio stations
