= Los Mártires =

- Locality of Bogotá
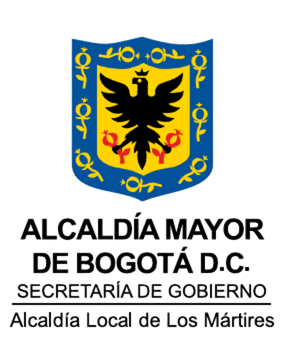
- Coat of arms

- Location of the locality in the city of Bogotá

- Location of the locality in the Capital District of Bogotá
- Coordinates: 4°36′16″N 74°05′24″W
- Country: Colombia
- City: Bogotá D.C.
- Neighbourhoods: List: Santa Isabel, Bogotá

Area
  - Total: 6.51 km^{2} (2.51 sq mi)
- Elevation: 2,600 m (8,500 ft)

Population (2007)
  - Total: 94,944
  - Density: 14,600/km^{2} (37,800/sq mi)
- Time zone: UTC-5 (Colombia Standard Time)
- Website: Official website

Los Mártires (Spanish for "The Martyrs") is the 14th locality of Bogotá, capital of Colombia. It is located near the city's downtown to its west. This district is mostly inhabited by lower middle and working class residents. It takes its name in honor of those who died during the war for independence from Spain. It is completely urbanized, save for its parks and the banks of its rivers.

== General information ==
=== Borders ===
- North: Diagonal 22 and Avenida El Dorado, with the locality of Teusaquillo
- South: Calle 8 Sur and Avenida Primera, with the locality of Antonio Nariño
- East: Avenida Caracas, with the locality of Santa Fe
- West: Carrera 30 with the locality of Puente Aranda

=== Hydrology ===
The Fucha River runs through the locality.

=== Topography ===
Los Mártires is relatively flat due to its location on the Bogotá savanna. It slopes slightly upward to the west.

=== Transportation ===
The locality is served by the Avenida Caracas and Calle 13 lines of the TransMilenio system, including the Avenida Jiménez transfer station.

== History ==
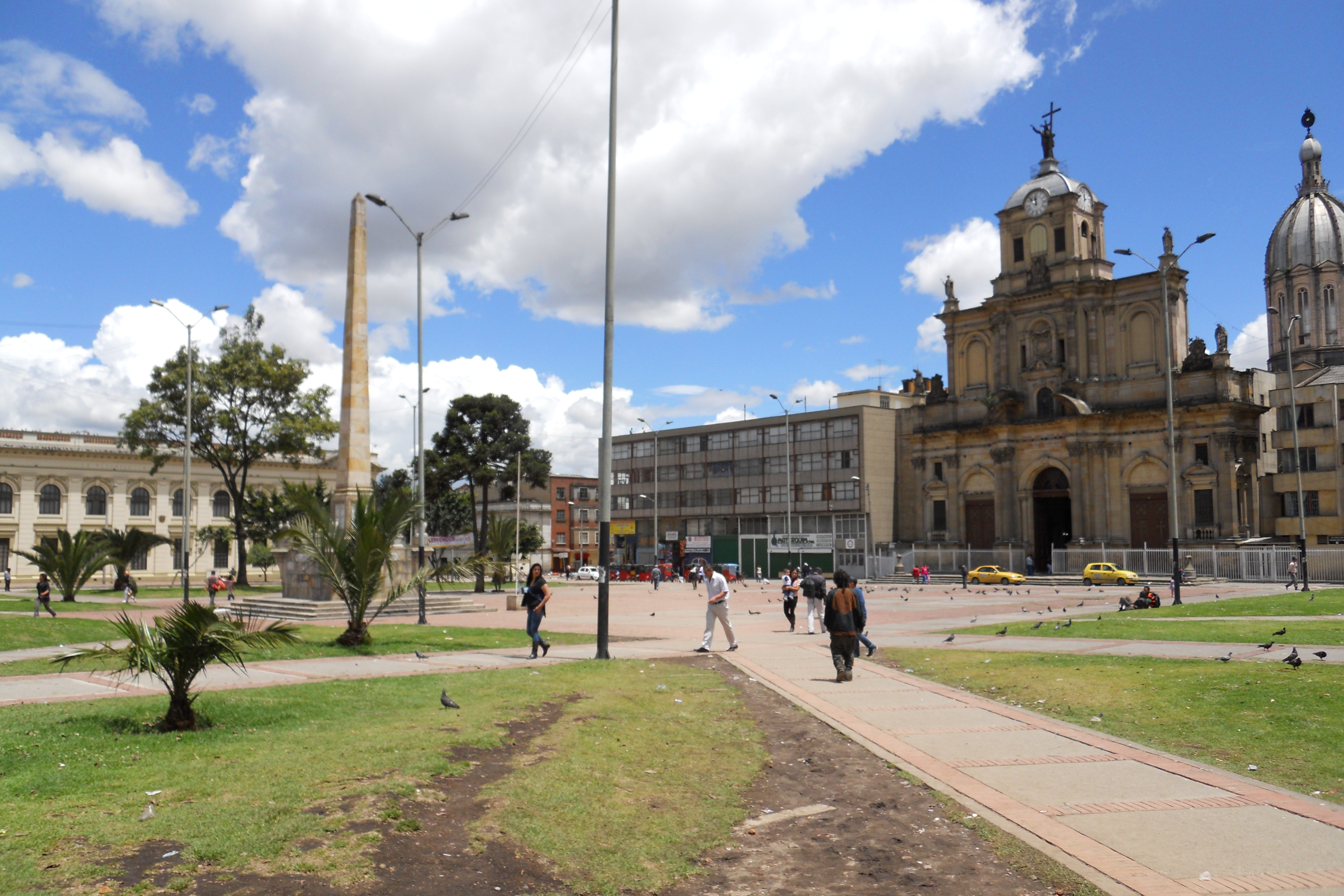
Los Mártires Park

In the area that is now Los Mártires Park Policarpa Salavarrieta, María Antonia Santos Plata, Mercedes Ábrego, Camilo Torres Tenorio, and Antonio José de Caldas died. In 1850, an obelisk was erected in their memory.

== Neighborhoods ==
The following neighborhoods form part of the locality: Santa Isabel, Ciudad Montes, Eduardo Santos and Paloquemao
