= Kennedy, Bogotá =

Kennedy
- Locality of Bogotá
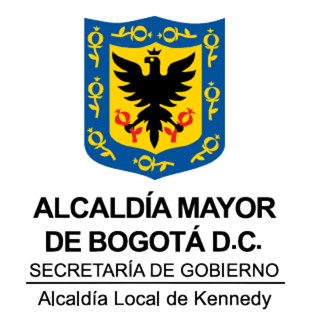
- Coat of arms

- Location of the locality in the city of Bogotá

- Location of the locality in the Capital District of Bogotá
- Coordinates: 4°38′37″N 74°09′12″W
- Country: Colombia
- City: Bogotá D.C.
- Neighbourhoods: List: Carvajal, Bogotá; Techo, Bogotá; Tintal (neighbourhood)

Area
  - Total: 38.59 km^{2} (14.90 sq mi)
- Elevation: 2,600 m (8,500 ft)

Population (2007)
  - Total: 979,914
  - Density: 25,390/km^{2} (65,770/sq mi)
- Time zone: UTC-5 (Colombia Standard Time)
- Website: Official website

Kennedy, or Ciudad Kennedy, is the eighth locality of Bogotá, capital of Colombia. It is located in the southwest of the city and is the second most populous being home to 14% of the city's residents. This district is mostly inhabited by working and low income residents.

== General information ==
=== Borders ===
- North: The Fucha River, bordering the Fontibón locality
- South: Autopista Sur and the Tunjuelo River, bordering the localities of Ciudad Bolívar and Tunjuelito
- East: Avenida Carrera 68, bordering the locality of Puente Aranda
- West: Bogotá River, with the municipality of Mosquera

=== Hydrology ===
The locality is bordered on two sides by the Fucha and Bogotá Rivers. In addition to these, it has some wetlands, including El Tintal.

=== Topography ===
Kennedy is relatively flat, due to its location on the Bogotá savanna.

=== Transportation ===
Major routes serving the locality include Avenida Primero de Mayo, Avenida Ciudad de Villavicencio, Avenida Boyaca, Avenida Carrera 68 (Congreso Eucarístico), Carrera 86, and Calle 44 Sur, Avenida Ciudad de Cali.

The locality is served by the city's mass transit system, TransMilenio, on its Avenida de Las Américas line to Portal de las Américas. As a terminus station is located within the locality, several feeder routes run throughout the various neighborhoods, including Casablanca, la Ciudadela, El Recreo, la Biblioteca El Tintal, Patio Bonito, Corabastos, and Castilla.

A large portion of the road network is in a poor state.

=== Points of interest ===
- Plazoleta de Banderas (a public square showing the flags of the Americas)
- El Tintal public library
- Lago Timiza park
- Central de Abastos (blocks full of food vendors)

=== Neighborhoods ===
The neighborhoods of Kennedy are: Castilla, Ciudad Roma, Ciudad Kennedy, Timiza, Patio Bonito, Alquería, Britalia, Tintal, Class, El Rubí, Mandalay, La Fragua, Villa Alsacia, El Carmelo, Casablanca, Villa Andrea, Alfonso Lopez, Villas de Kennedy, El Gran Colombiano, Techo, Villa Claudia, El Socorro and Tintalito.

== History ==
Ciudad Kennedy formed part of the land settled by Muisca probably as far back as the 6th century BC, and its historic name in Muysccubun is Techotyna. The Spanish, through the Spanish conquest of the Muisca of 1537, utilized this area for farms and cattle ranches. The 20th century brought further transformation, with urbanization starting in the 1930s. In 1948, Bavaria opened its main brewery in Kennedy.

In 1961, an urbanization project was undertaken, financed in part by the Alianza para el Progreso (Alliance for Progress). The locality was known as Ciudad Techo until 1963, when the name was changed in honor of the assassinated John F. Kennedy, who had visited Bogotá in 1961 and supported the Alliance for Progress.

== Economy ==
The western and southern parts of the locality are developed as commercial and industrial zones, including the Bavaria brewery. There is also a location of the SENA technical school, and various shopping areas.

== See also ==
- List of memorials to John F. Kennedy
