= Portal de Las Américas (TransMilenio) =

Local bus terminal for the metropolitan area of Bogota

Portal de las Américas
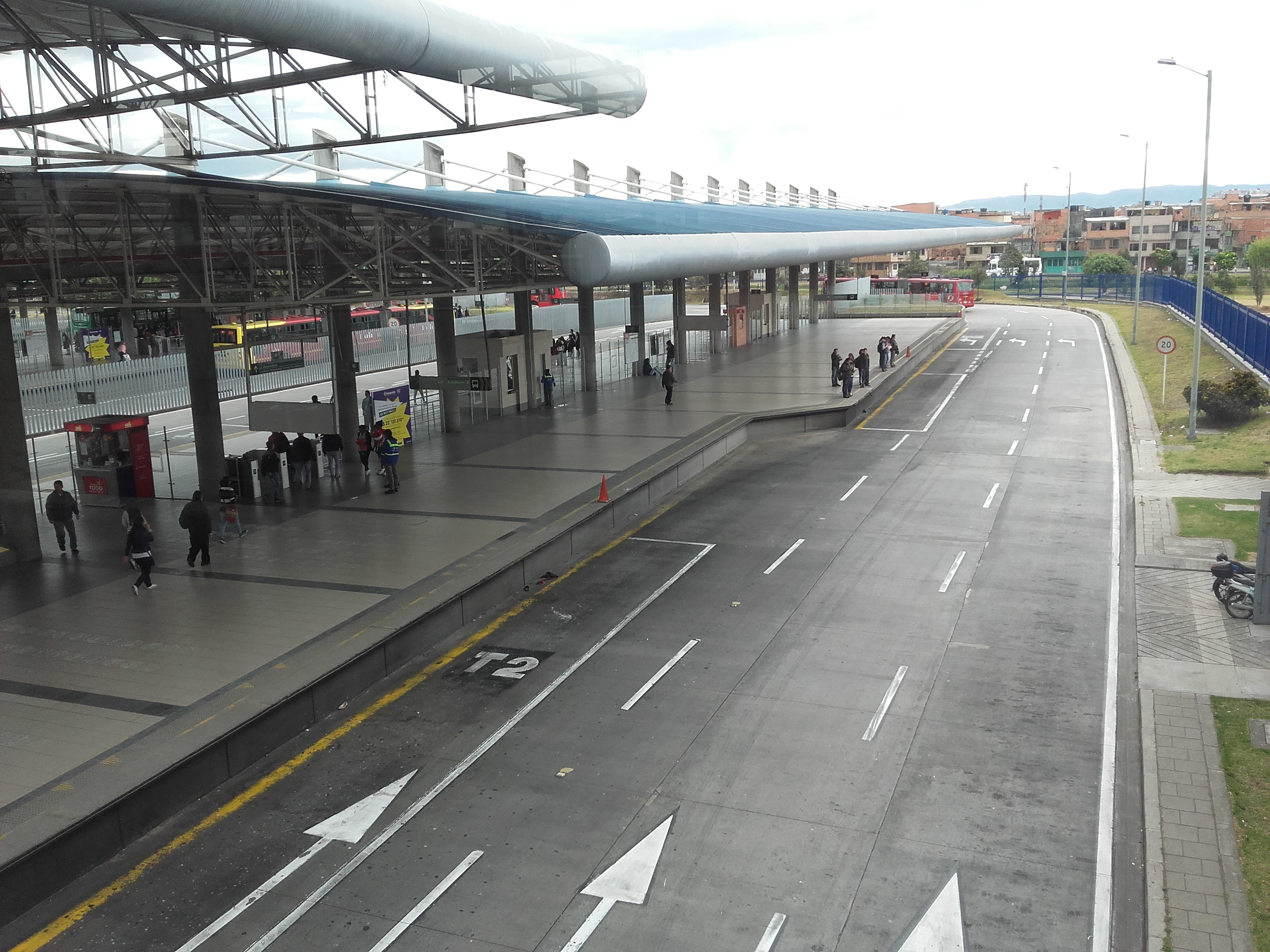

General information
- Location: Avenida Ciudad de Cali with Avenida Ciudad de Villavicencio; Kennedy
- Line(s): Américas
- Platforms: 3

History
- Opened: December 21, 2003

Services
Preceding station	TransMilenio	Following station
Patio Bonito towards Avenida Jiménez	F	Terminus

Portal de las Américas is a terminus station of the TransMilenio mass-transit system of Bogotá, Colombia, which opened in the year 2000.

== Location ==
Portal de las Américas is located in southwestern Bogotá, specifically on Avenida Ciudad de Cali with Avenida Ciudad de Villavicencio. It is also known for its many ghost sightings

== History ==
In December 2003, this station was opened before work was even finished on the line running along the Avenida Ciudad de Cali. It was the fifth terminus of the system to be opened.

At first, only red buses of the size of the feeder buses were used at this station. They bore signs reading P.A. or PORTAL AMÉRICAS but did not have a formal route number. In May 2004, after the Biblioteca Tintal and Patio Bonito stations were opened, the station began normal operations on one of its three platforms.

== Station services ==
=== Old trunk services ===
Services rendered until April 29, 2006
Kind	Routes	Frequency
Current		Every 3 minutes on average
Express	Expreso 100 Expreso 120	Every 2 minutes on average
Super Express	Expreso 200 Expreso 201 Expreso 300 Expreso 301	Every 2 minutes on average
Express Dominical	Expreso Dominical 45	Every 3 or 4 minutes on average

=== Main line service ===
Service as of March, 2022
Type	Northern routes
Local	5
Express Every Day; All day	A60 / J23
Express Monday through Saturday; All day	M51 / B28
Express Monday through Friday; Morning rush	B52 / E32
Express Monday through Friday; Mixed service, morning and evening rush	C29
Ending Routes
Local	5
Express Every Day; All day	F60 / F23
Express Monday through Saturday; All day	F51 / F28
Express Monday through Saturday; Evening rush	F62 / F32
Express Monday through Friday; Mixed service, morning and evening rush	F29

=== Feeder routes ===
The following feeder routes serve this station:

- 9.1 Casablanca loop
- 9.2 Metrovivienda loop
- 9.3 Bosa La Libertad loop
- 9.4 Patio Bonito loop
- 9.5 Avenida Tintal loop
- 9.6 Avenida Villavicencio loop
- 9.7 Bosa la Independencia loop
- 9.8 Porvenir loop
- 9.9 Bosa-Santafé loop
- 9.10 Roma loop
- 9.11 Franja Seca loop

=== Inter-city service ===
Despite having three platforms, the Portal de las Américas does not have inter-city buses because it is located in a populous area in the southwest of the city, far from any routes leaving town.

== See also ==
- List of TransMilenio Stations
