= Avenida Jiménez (TransMilenio) =

Bus station in Bogotá, Colombia

Avenida Jiménez (A)
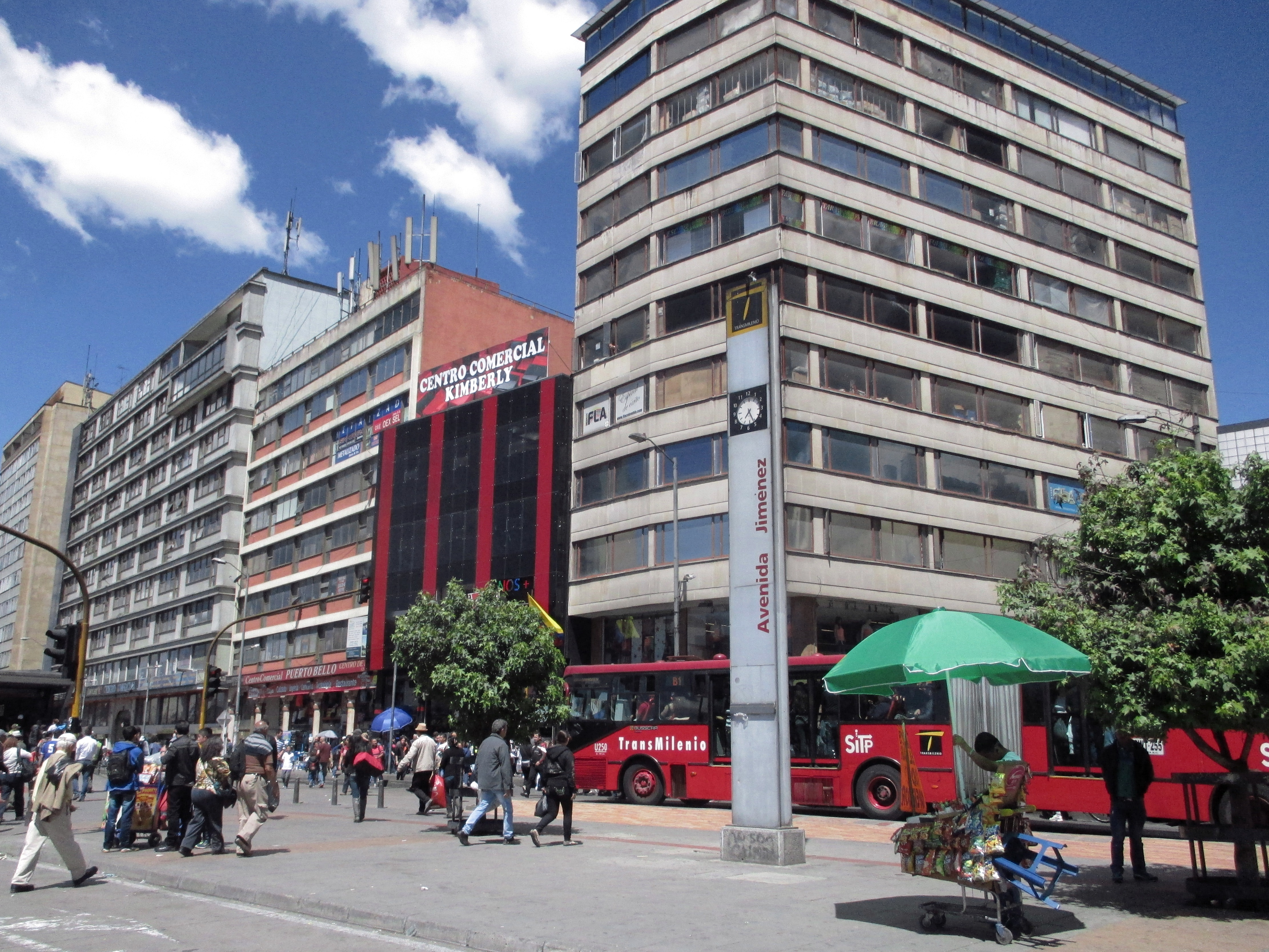

General information
- Location: Avenida Caracas between Calles 11 and 13; Los Mártires
- Line: Caracas
- Platforms: 3

History
- Opened: December 17, 2000

Services
Preceding station	TransMilenio	Following station
Calle 19 towards Calle 76	A	Tercer Milenio Terminus

Avenida Jiménez (F)
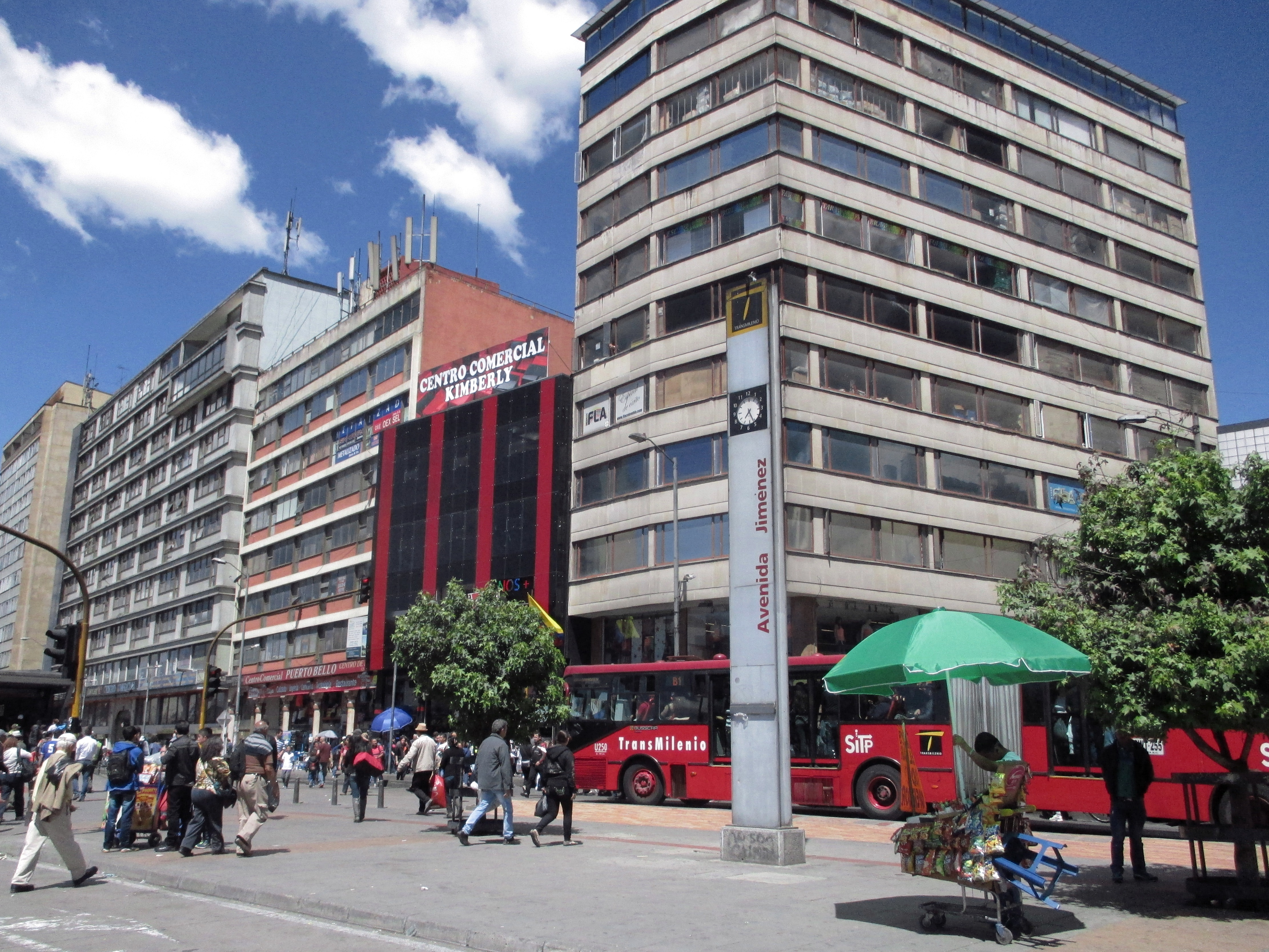

General information
- Location: Avenida Caracas between Calles 11 and 13; Los Mártires
- Line: Caracas
- Platforms: 3

History
- Opened: 2003

Services
Preceding station	TransMilenio	Following station
Terminus	F	De La Sabana towards Portal de Las Américas
Museo del Oro towards Las Aguas	J	Terminus
San Diego Terminus	L	Las Nieves towards Portal 20 de Julio

Avenida Jiménez is a transfer station, part of the TransMilenio mass-transit system of Bogotá, Colombia.

== Location ==
The station is located in the heart of downtown Bogotá, specifically at the intersection of Avenida Jiménez with Avenida Caracas.

== History ==
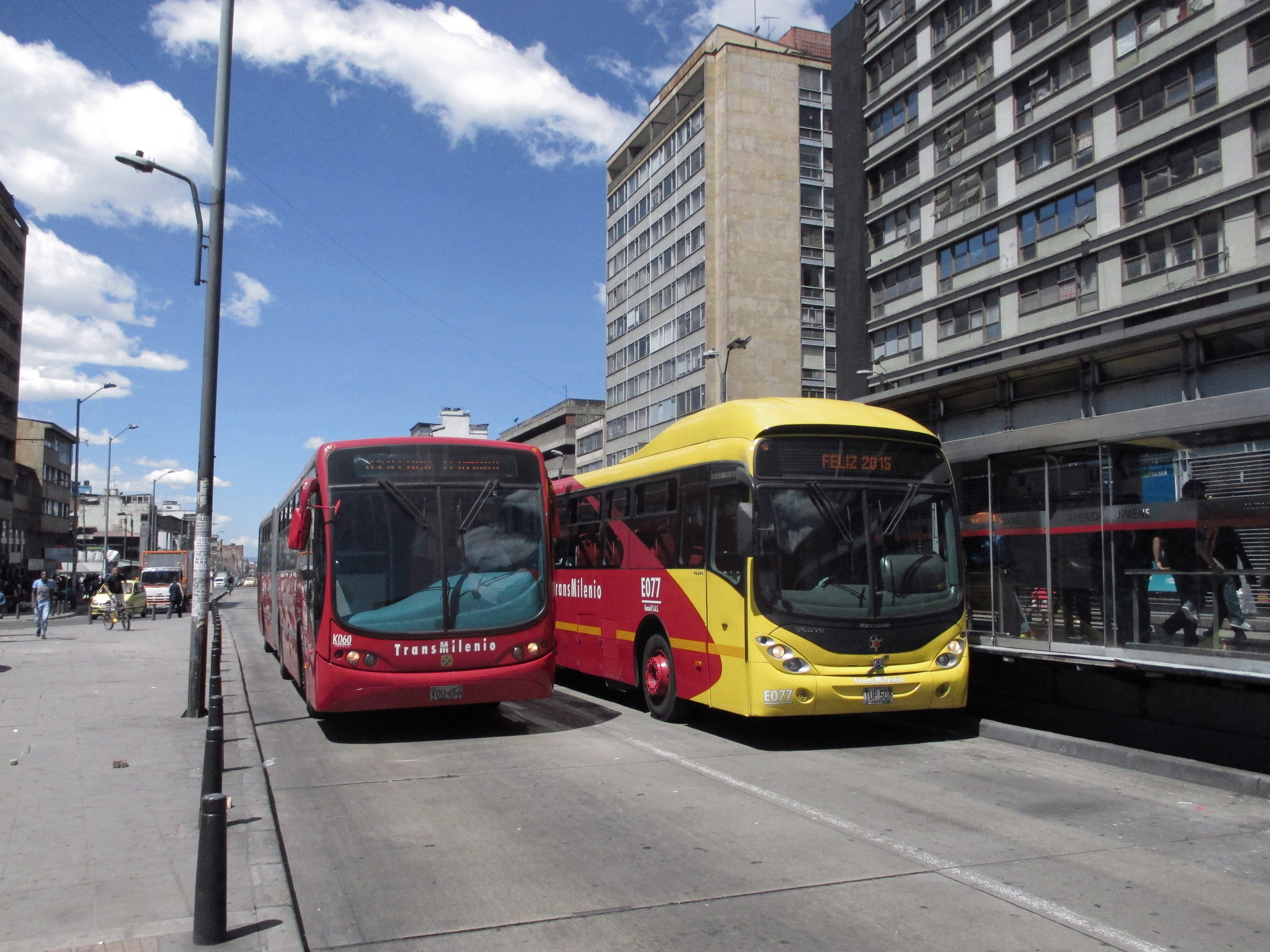
Buses of TransMilenio in the station Avenida Jimenez.

The station entered operation on December 17, 2000 as part of the original Transmilenio system, only to be closed a year later for construction of the Eje Ambiental, which was opened in 2002.

After the opening of the Jiménez-Calle 13 trunk, the station was converted from a simple station into an interchange between the aforementioned trunk and Avenida Caracas with five platforms. The station serves an average of 500,000 passengers per day.

The station has three entrances: one on Avenida Caracas with Calle 11, another on Avenida Jiménez with Carrera 12, and one on the south-east intersection of Avenida Caracas with Avenida Jiménez, which has access to the underground foot tunnel.

It serves the La Capuchina, Santa Inés, and San Victorino neighborhoods.

This station has a "Punto de Encuentro" or point of gathering, which has bathrooms, coffeeshop, parking for bicycles and a tourist attention booth.

After the inauguration of the trunk Jiménez-Calle 13, what was a simple station became an interchange between the Jiménez-Calle 13 and that of Caracas Avenue with 5 wagons in service. As such the station has a full attendance of 500,000 daily users on average.

Together with the Ricaurte and Universidades-Las Aguas stations, it is one of three transfer stations of TransMilenio.

On August 29, during the national agrarian strike in Colombia, attacks against this station of the system were recorded on the wagons corresponding to Avenida Jiménez with Carrera 12, Leaving multiple damages and material losses. However, the next day the station was running normally with new infrastructure.

On May 1, 2015, during the marches of International Workers' Day, a new attack against this station was registered, in the same wagons of Carrera 12 with the avenue Jiménez, where 16 people were injured and a loss of 5 million pesos caused.

== Station services ==
=== Old trunk services/Caracas ===
Services rendered until April 29, 2006
Kind	Routes	Frequency
Current	2 Portal Norte 3 Portal Norte	Every 3 minutes on average
Express	Expreso 20 Expreso 30 Expreso 50 Expreso 70 Expreso 90	Every 2 minutes on average
Express Dominical	Expreso Dominical 15 Expreso Dominical 25	Every 3 or 4 minutes on average

=== Old trunk services/Américas ===
Services rendered until April 29, 2006
Kind	Routes	Frequency
Current		Every 3 minutes on average
Express	Expreso 10 Expreso 120 Expreso 170	Every 2 minutes on average
Super Express	Expreso 400	Every 2 minutes on average
Express Dominical	Expreso Dominical 35 Expreso Dominical 45	Every 3 or 4 minutes on average

=== Main line service/Caracas ===
Service as of April 29, 2006
Type	Northern Routes	Southern Routes	Western Routes
Local	3 / 8	3 / 8	
Express Monday through Saturday; All day	D20 / B73	H20 / H74 / L10	K10
Express Monday through Saturday; Morning rush	D51		
Express Monday through Friday; Mixed service, rush and non-rush	B27 / C17	H27 / H17	
Express Saturday; All Day	C17	H17	
Express Sundays and holidays	B92 / B93	H92 / H93 / L97	K97

=== Main line service/Américas ===
Service as of April 29, 2006
Type	Northern Routes	Eastern Routes	Western Routes
Local		5	5
Express Monday through Saturday; All day		J23	F23
Express Monday through Saturday; Morning rush		J70	
Express Sundays and holidays	C91	M99	F91 / F99

=== Feeder routes ===
This station does not have connections to feeder routes.

=== Inter-city service ===
This station does not have inter-city service.

== See also ==
- List of TransMilenio Stations
