= Calle 106 (TransMilenio) =

Bus station in Bogotá, Colombia

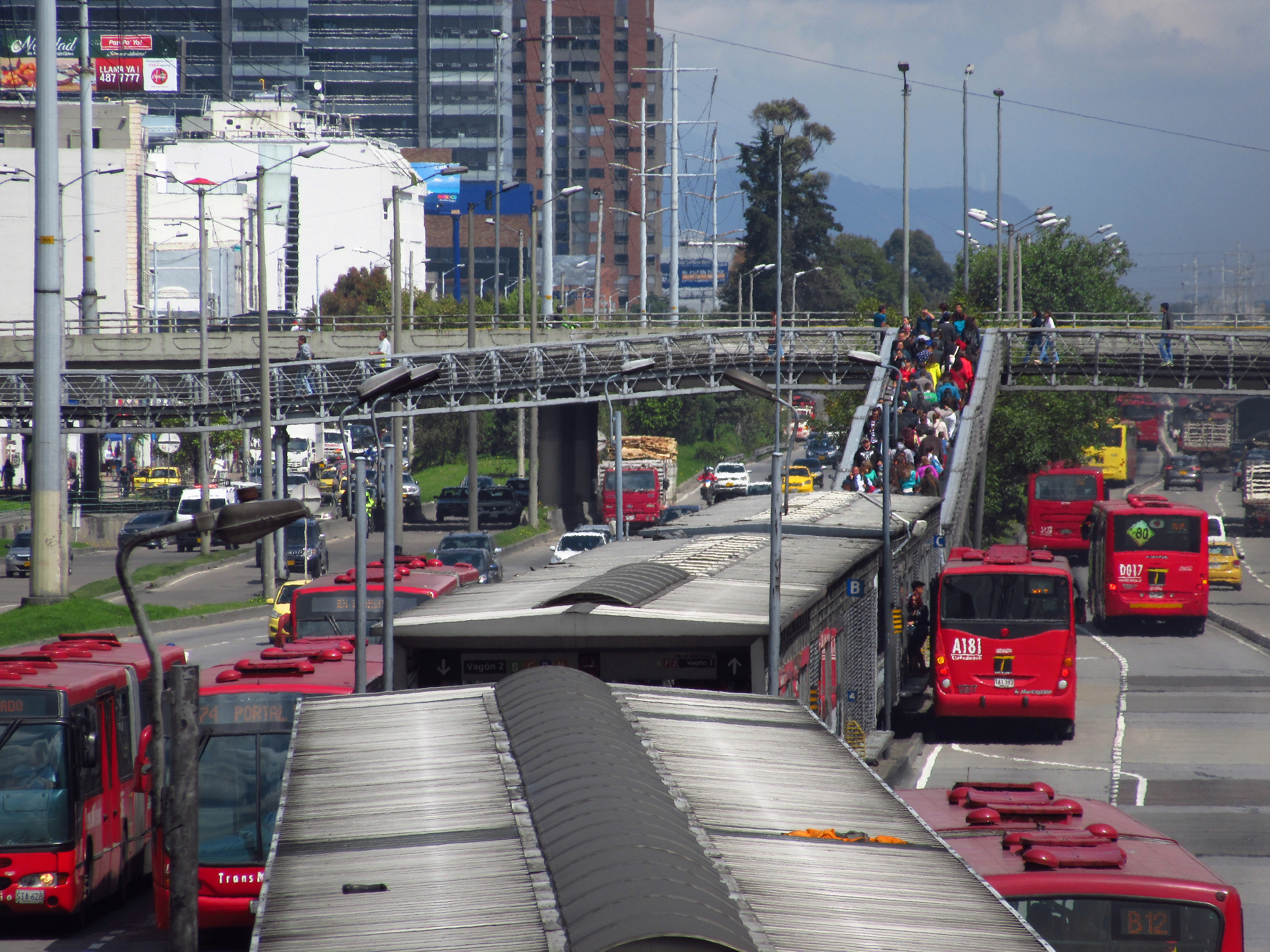

General information
- Location: Autopista Norte with Calle 105; Usaquén and Suba (Bogotá); Colombia

History
- Opened: 2001

Services
| Preceding station | TransMilenio | Following station |
|---|---|---|
| Pepe Sierra towards Terminal | B | Calle 100 towards Héroes |
Location

The simple station Calle 106 is part of the TransMilenio mass-transit system of Bogotá, Colombia, which opened in the year 2000.

== Location ==
The station is located in northern Bogotá, specifically on Autopista Norte with Calle 105.

It serves the Santa Bibiana, Estoril and San Patricio neighborhoods.

== History ==
After the opening of the Portal de Usme in early 2001, the Autopista Norte line was opened. This station was added as a northerly expansion of that line, which was completed with the opening of the Portal del Norte later that year.

The station is named Calle 106 due to its proximity to that important road in northeastern Bogotá.

Nearby are locations of Jasban (dental clinic) and the main clinic of the EPS Colsanitas.

On the night of April 9, 2013, attacks against this system station were recorded. On that occasion, the stations Calle 100 (TransMilenio), Calle 106 (TransMilenio), Prado, Alcalá, Calle 142 (TransMilenio), Calle 146 (TransMilenio), Mazurén (TransMilenio), Calle 161 (TransMilenio), Calle 187 (TransMilenio), and Terminal (TM) with Autopista Norte, where they left $ 22 million Weights in losses

== Station Services ==
=== Old trunk services ===
Services rendered until April 29, 2006
| Kind | Routes | Frequency |
|---|---|---|
| Current | | Every 3 minutes on average |
| Express | Expreso 130 | Every 2 minutes on average |

=== Main line service ===
Service as of April 29, 2006
| Type | Northwards | Southwards | Frequency |
|---|---|---|---|
| Local | 8 | 8 | Every three minutes |
| Express Monday through Saturday; All day | B10 / B11 / B13 | D10 / G11 / H13 | Every two minutes |
| Express Monday through Saturday; Mixed service, rush and non-rush | B28 | F28 | Every two minutes |

=== Feeder routes ===
This station does not have connections to feeder routes.

=== Inter-city service ===
This station does not have inter-city service.

== See also ==
- Bogotá
- TransMilenio
- List of TransMilenio Stations
