= Calle 187 (TransMilenio) =

Bus station in Bogotá, Colombia

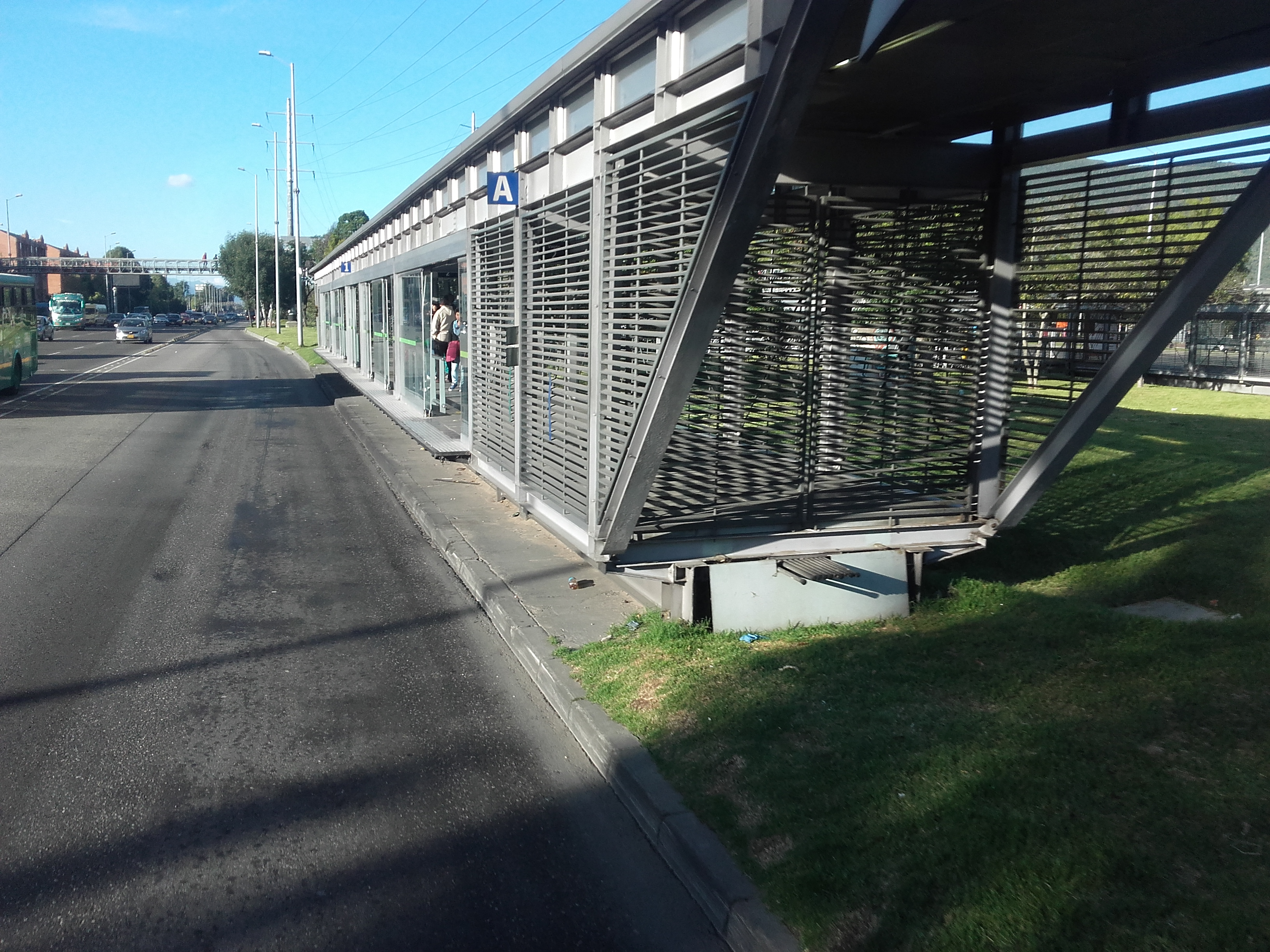

General information
- Location: Usaquén and Suba (Bogotá); Colombia

History
- Opened: January 28, 2012

Services
Preceding station	TransMilenio	Following station
Terminal Terminus	B	Portal del Norte towards Héroes
Location

The simple station Calle 187 is part of the TransMilenio mass-transit system of Bogotá, Colombia, which opened in the year 2000.

== Location ==
The station is located in the north of the city, on the North Highway between 185 and 187 streets. It is accessed by a pedestrian bridge located between these two routes.

Serves the demand of the neighborhoods Mirandela, the Cerezo and its environs.

Close to the station is the Santafé Shopping Center, Mirandela Plaza, Plaza Norte, Autopista 184 and Mirandela Park.

== History ==
Works for the extension of the trunk of the Autopista Norte began in 2009, the year in which the avenue was expanded from 182 to 192. The station opened to the public in January 2012.

On the night of April 9, 2013, attacks against the station were recorded. On that occasion, the stations Calle 100 (TransMilenio), Calle 106 (TransMilenio), Prado (TransMilenio), Alcalá (TransMilenio), Calle 142 (TransMilenio), Calle 146 (TransMilenio), Mazurén (TransMilenio), Calle 161 (TransMilenio), Calle 187 (TransMilenio), and Terminal (TM) with Autopista Norte, were left with $22 million in damages.

== Station services ==
=== Main line service ===
Service as of January 28, 2012
Type	Northwards	Southwards	Westhwards
Local	8	8	
Express Monday through Saturday; All day	B11 / B18	G11 / L18	
Express Monday through Friday; All day	B16		K16

== Complementary service ==
The following complementary routes operate from January 25, 2016:

2.6 circular to the sector of Guaymaral.

18.3 circular to the sector of Germania.

=== Inter-city service ===
This station does not have inter-city service.

== See also ==
- Bogotá
- TransMilenio
- List of TransMilenio Stations
