= Calle 100 (TransMilenio) =

Bus station in Bogotá, Colombia

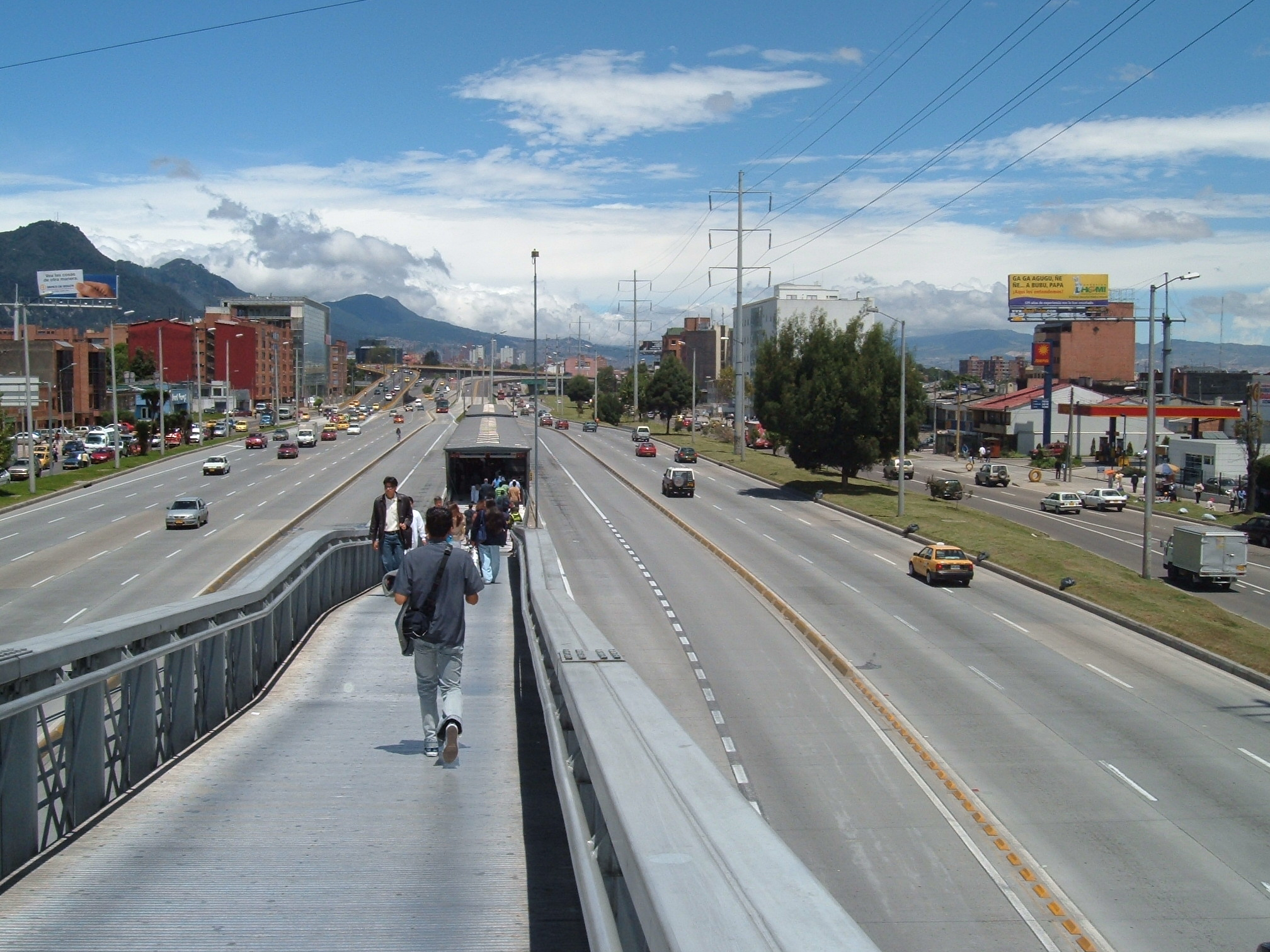

General information
- Location: Autopista Norte with Calle 98; Chapinero and Barrios Unidos; Colombia

History
- Opened: 2001

Services
Preceding station	TransMilenio	Following station
Calle 106 towards Terminal	B	Virrey towards Héroes
Terminus	E	La Castellana towards Tygua - San José
Location

The simple-station Calle 100 is part of the TransMilenio mass-transit system of Bogotá, Colombia, which opened in the year 2000.

== Location ==
The station is located in northern Bogotá, specifically on the Autopista Norte with Calle 98.

== History ==
After the opening of Portal de Usme in early 2001, the Autopista Norte line was inaugurated, and this station was included. A few months later, Portal del Norte was opened, leading to a change in this station's line.

The station is named Calle 100 due to its proximity to the bridge which carries Avenida Calle 100 (also called Avenida España) over the Autopista Norte.

It serves the demand of the La Castellana and Chicó Norte III Sector neighborhoods, as well as the commercial and financial areas located on Calle 100 and Avenida Carrera 19.

On the night of April 9, 2013, attacks against this system station were recorded. On that occasion, the stations Calle 100 (TransMilenio), Calle 106 (TransMilenio), Prado, Alcalá, Calle 142 (TransMilenio), Calle 146 (TransMilenio), Mazurén (TransMilenio), Calle 161 (TransMilenio), Calle 187 (TransMilenio), and Terminal (TM) with Autopista Norte, where they left $ 22 million Weights in losses

== Station Services ==
=== Old trunk services ===
Services rendered until April 29, 2006
Kind	Routes	Frequency
Current		Every 3 minutes on average
Express	Expreso 50 Expreso 60 Expreso 70 Expreso 100	Every 2 minutes on average
Express Dominical	Expreso Dominical 25	Every 3 or 4 minutes on average

=== Main line service ===
Service as of April 29, 2006
Type	Northwards	Southwards	Frequency
Local	8	8	Every three minutes
Express Monday through Saturday; All day	B10 / B12 / B13 / B14 / B73	D10 / G12 / H13 / F14 / H74	Every two minutes
Express Monday through Saturday; Morning rush	B71		Every two minutes
Express Monday through Friday; Mixed service, rush and non-rush	B50	C61	Every two minutes
Express Monday through Saturday; Mixed service, rush and non-rush	B74	J72	Every two minutes
Express Sunday and holidays	B90 / B92 / B94	G90 / H92 / D94	Every 3–4 minutes

=== Feeder routes ===
This station does not have connections to feeder routes.

=== Inter-city service ===
This station does not have inter-city service.

== See also ==
- Bogotá
- List of TransMilenio Stations
- TransMilenio
