= Calle 85 (TransMilenio) =

Columbian rapid bus stop

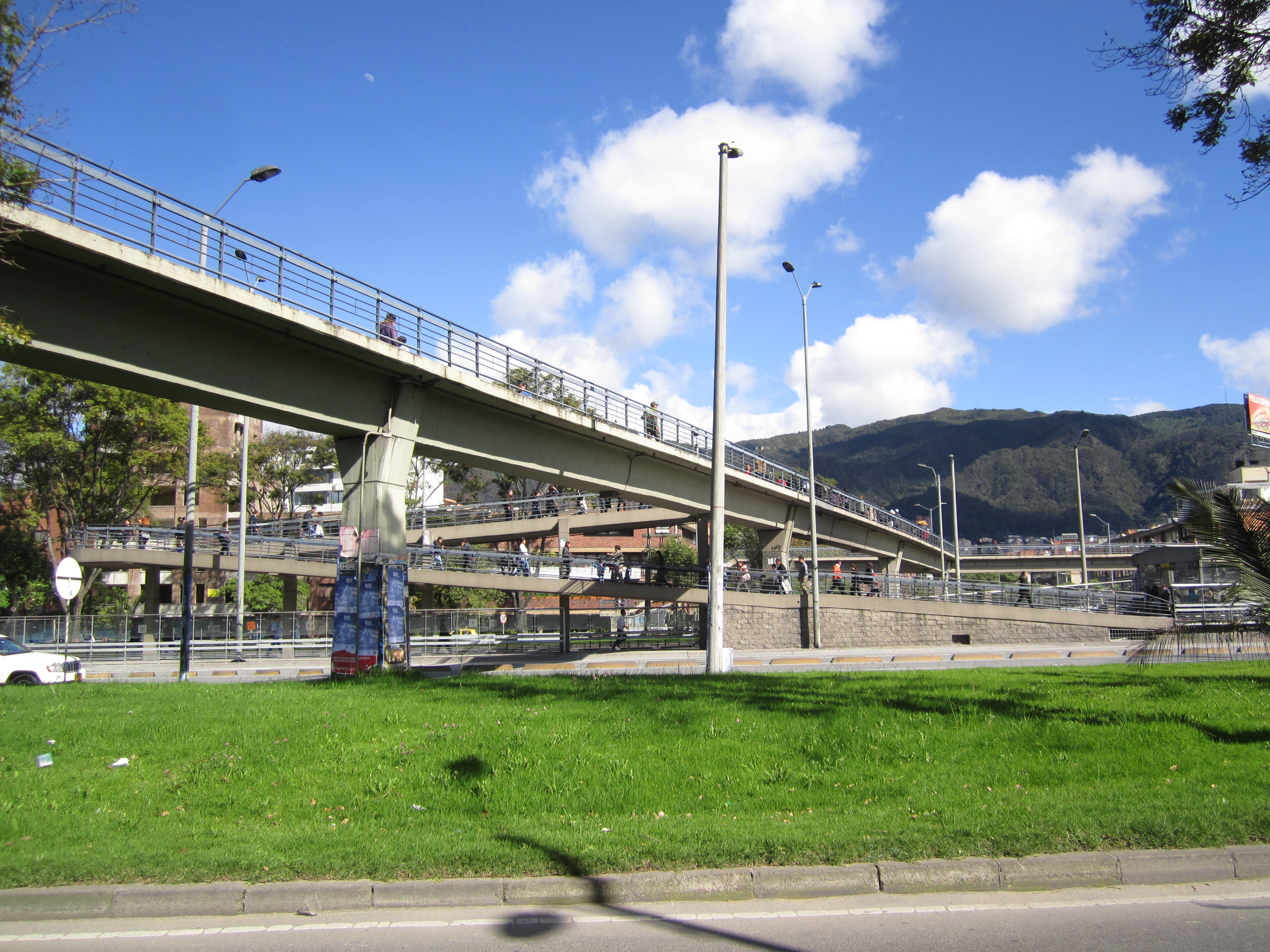

General information
- Location: Chapinero and Barrios Unidos; Colombia

History
- Opened: 2001

Services
Preceding station	TransMilenio	Following station
Virrey towards Terminal	B	Héroes Terminus
Location

The simple station Calle 85 is part of the TransMilenio mass-transit system of Bogotá, Colombia, which opened in 2000.

== Location ==
The station is located in northern Bogotá, on Autopista Norte with Calle 85.

It serves the Polo Club and Antiguo Country neighborhoods, as well as the shopping areas on Carrera 15 and the nearby Zona Rosa.

== History ==
After the opening of the Portal de Usme in early 2001, the Autopista Norte line was opened. This station was added as a northerly expansion of that line, which was completed with the opening of the Portal del Norte later that year.

The station is named Calle 85 due to its proximity to that road.

== Station services ==
=== Old trunk services ===
Services rendered until April 29, 2006
Kind	Routes	Frequency
Current		Every 3 minutes on average
Express	Expreso 70 Expreso 100 Expreso 140	Every 2 minutes on average

=== Main line service ===
Service as of April 29, 2006
Type	Northwards	Southwards	Frequency
Local	8	8	Every three minutes
Express Monday through Saturday; All day	B10 / B11 / B13 / B14 / B23	D10 / G11 / H13 / F14 / K23	Every two minutes
Express Monday through Friday; Mixed service, rush and non-rush	B27 / B50	H27 / C61	Every two minutes
Express Monday through Saturday; Morning rush	B71		Every two minutes
Express Sunday and holidays	B92 / B93	H92 / H93	Every 3–4 minutes

=== Feeder routes ===
This station does not have connections to feeder routes.

=== Inter-city service ===
This station does not have inter-city service.

== See also ==
- List of TransMilenio Stations
