= Virrey (TransMilenio) =

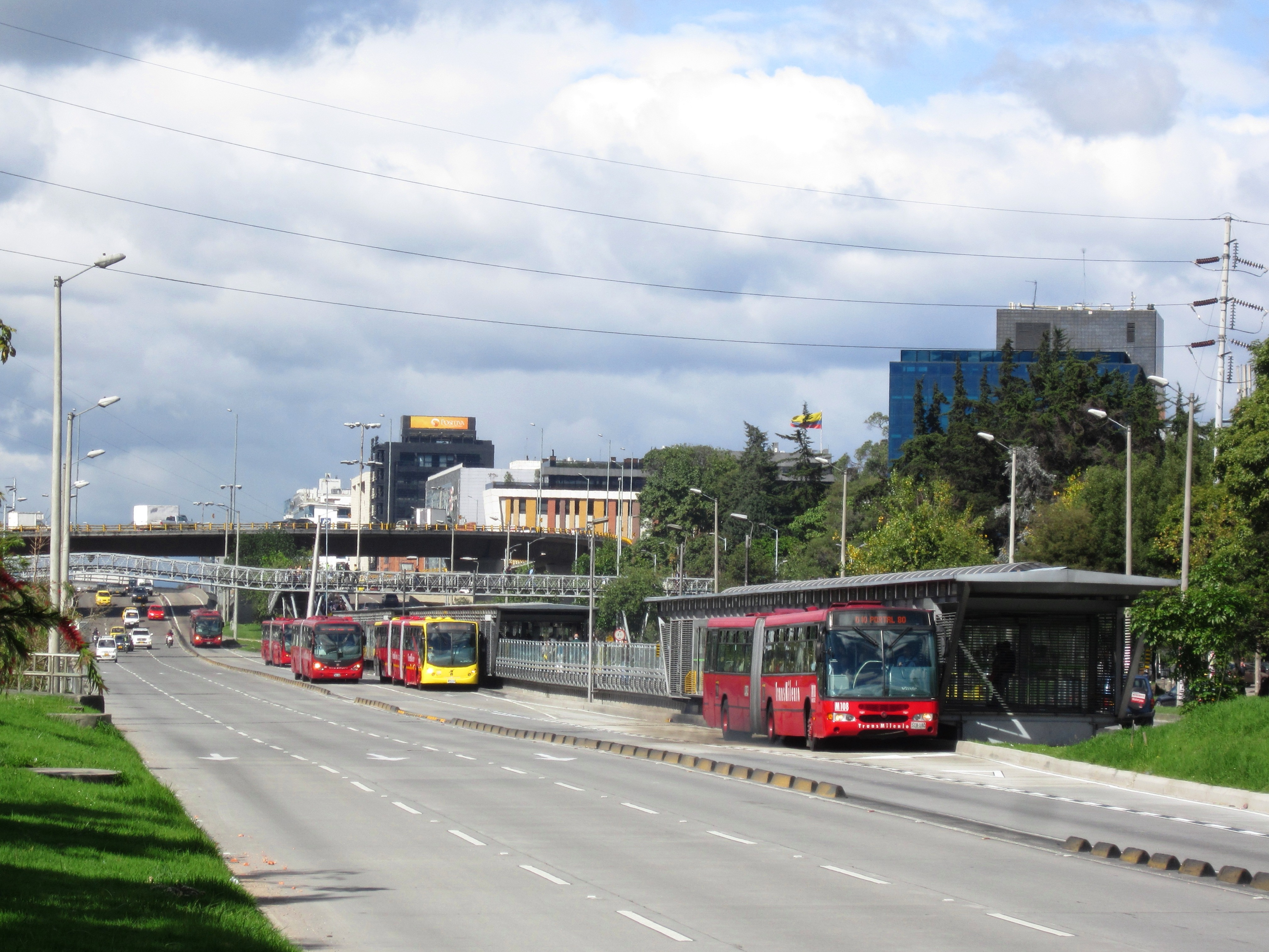

General information
- Location: Chapinero, Bogotá; Colombia

History
- Opened: 2001

Services
Preceding station	TransMilenio	Following station
Calle 100 towards Terminal	B	Calle 85 towards Héroes
Location

The simple station Virrey is part of the TransMilenio mass-transit system of Bogotá, Colombia, which opened in the year 2000.

== Location ==
The station is located in northern Bogotá, specifically on Autopista Norte with Calle 90.

It serves the Chicó and Polo Club neighborhoods, as well as the commercial areas on Calle 90 and part of the Zona Rosa area. It's the closest one to the "Parque de la 93"

== History ==
After the opening of the Portal de Usme in early 2001, the Autopista Norte line was opened. This station was added as a northerly expansion of that line, which was completed with the opening of the Portal del Norte later that year.

The station is named Virrey due to its proximity to Parque El Virrey, a greenway and bike path that follow Calle 88 from Avenida 7a to Autopista Norte.

== Station Services ==
=== Old trunk services ===
Services rendered until April 29, 2006
Kind	Routes	Frequency
Current		Every 3 minutes on average
Express	Expreso 60 Expreso 140	Every 2 minutes on average

=== Main line service ===
Service as of April 29, 2006
Type	Northwards	Southwards	Frequency
Local	8	8	Every three minutes
Express Monday through Saturday; All day	B10 / B11 / B18	D10 / G11 / L18	Every two minutes
Express Monday through Saturday; Morning rush	B52 / B71		Every two minutes
Express Monday through Friday; Mixed service, rush and non-rush	B27 / B50	H27 / C61	Every two minutes
Express Monday through Saturday; Mixed service, rush and non-rush	B74	J72	Every two minutes
Express Sunday and holidays	B93	H93	Every 3–4 minutes

=== Feeder routes ===
This station does not have connections to feeder routes.

=== Inter-city service ===
This station does not have inter-city service.

== See also ==
- Bogotá
- TransMilenio
- List of TransMilenio Stations
