= Toberín (TransMilenio) =

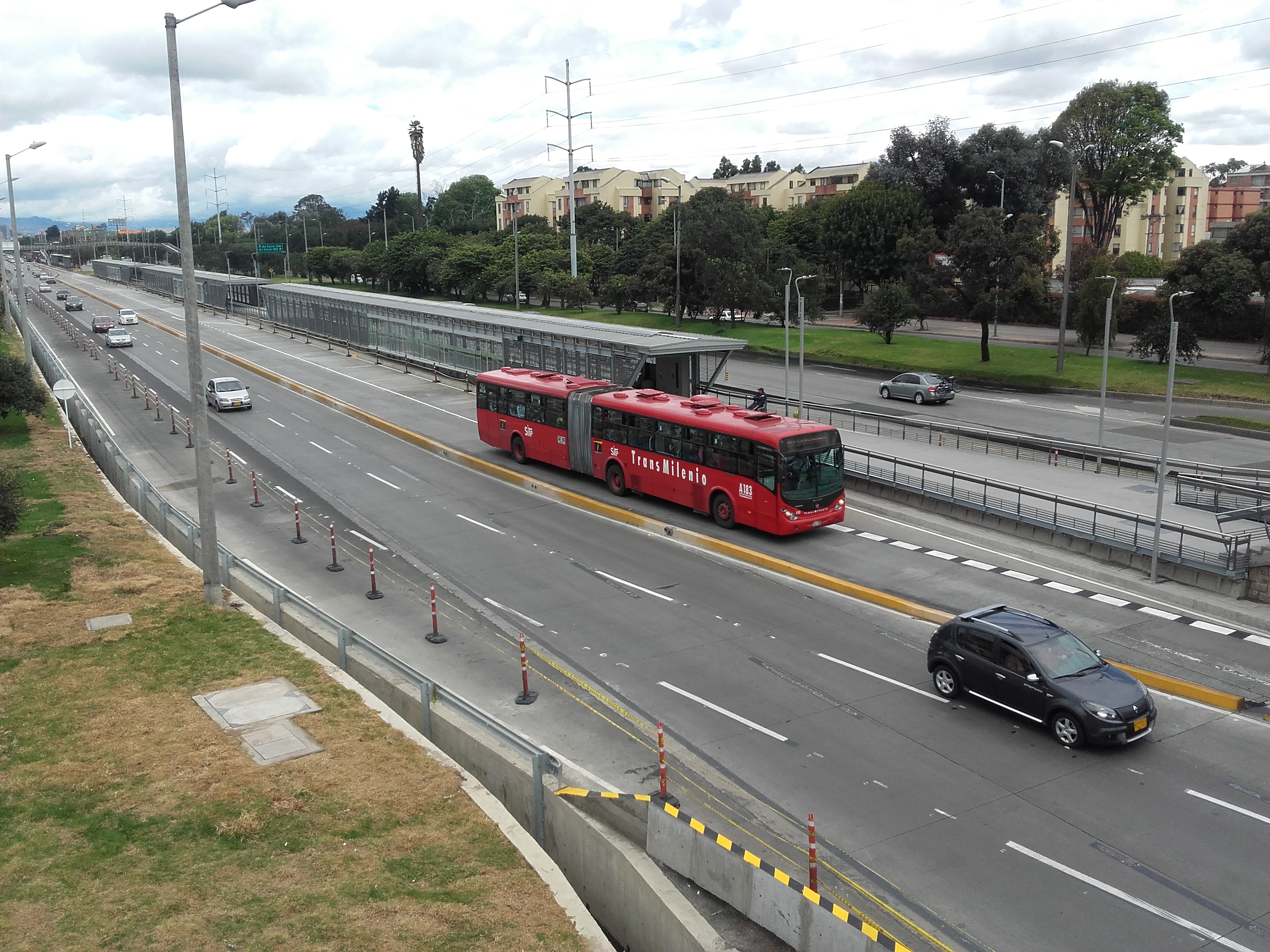

General information
- Location: Autopista Norte with Calle 165; Usaquén and Suba, Bogotá; Colombia

History
- Opened: 2001

Services
Preceding station	TransMilenio	Following station
Portal del Norte towards Terminal	B	Calle 161 towards Héroes
Location

Toberín is a simple station, part of the TransMilenio mass-transit system of Bogotá, Colombia.

== Location ==
The station is located in northern Bogotá, specifically on Autopista Norte with calle 165.

It serves the Toberín, Britalia and Granada Norte neighborhoods.

== History ==
After the opening of the Portal de Usme in early 2001, the Autopista Norte line was opened. This station was added as a northerly expansion of that line, which was completed with the opening of the Portal del Norte later that year.

The station is named Toberín due to its proximity to the neighborhood of the same name, located in the locality of Usaquén.

== Station services ==
=== Old trunk services ===
Services rendered until April 29, 2006
Kind	Routes	Frequency
Current		Every 3 minutes on average
Express	Expreso 60 Expreso 70 Expreso 140	Every 2 minutes on average
Express Dominical	Expreso Dominical 25	Every 3 or 4 minutes on average

=== Main line service ===
Services since April the 29th 2006
Type	Northwards	Southwards	Frequency
Local	8	8	Every three minutes
Express Monday through Saturday; All day	B10 / B11 / B12 / B72 / B73	D10 / G11 / G12 / H61 / H74	Every two minutes
Express Monday through Friday; Morning rush	B16	K16	Every two minutes
Express Monday through Saturday; Morning rush	B71		Every two minutes
Express Monday through Friday; Morning rush		J70 / A74	Every two minutes
Express Monday through Saturday; Mixed service, rush and non-rush	B74	J72	Every two minutes
Express Monday through Friday; Mixed service, rush and non-rush		H73	Every two minutes
Express Sunday and holidays	B92 / B93 / B94	H92 / H93 / D94	Every 3–4 minutes

=== Feeder routes ===
This station does not have connections to feeder routes.

=== Inter-city service ===
This station does not have inter-city service.

== See also ==
- Bogotá
- TransMilenio
- List of TransMilenio Stations
