= Pepe Sierra (TransMilenio) =

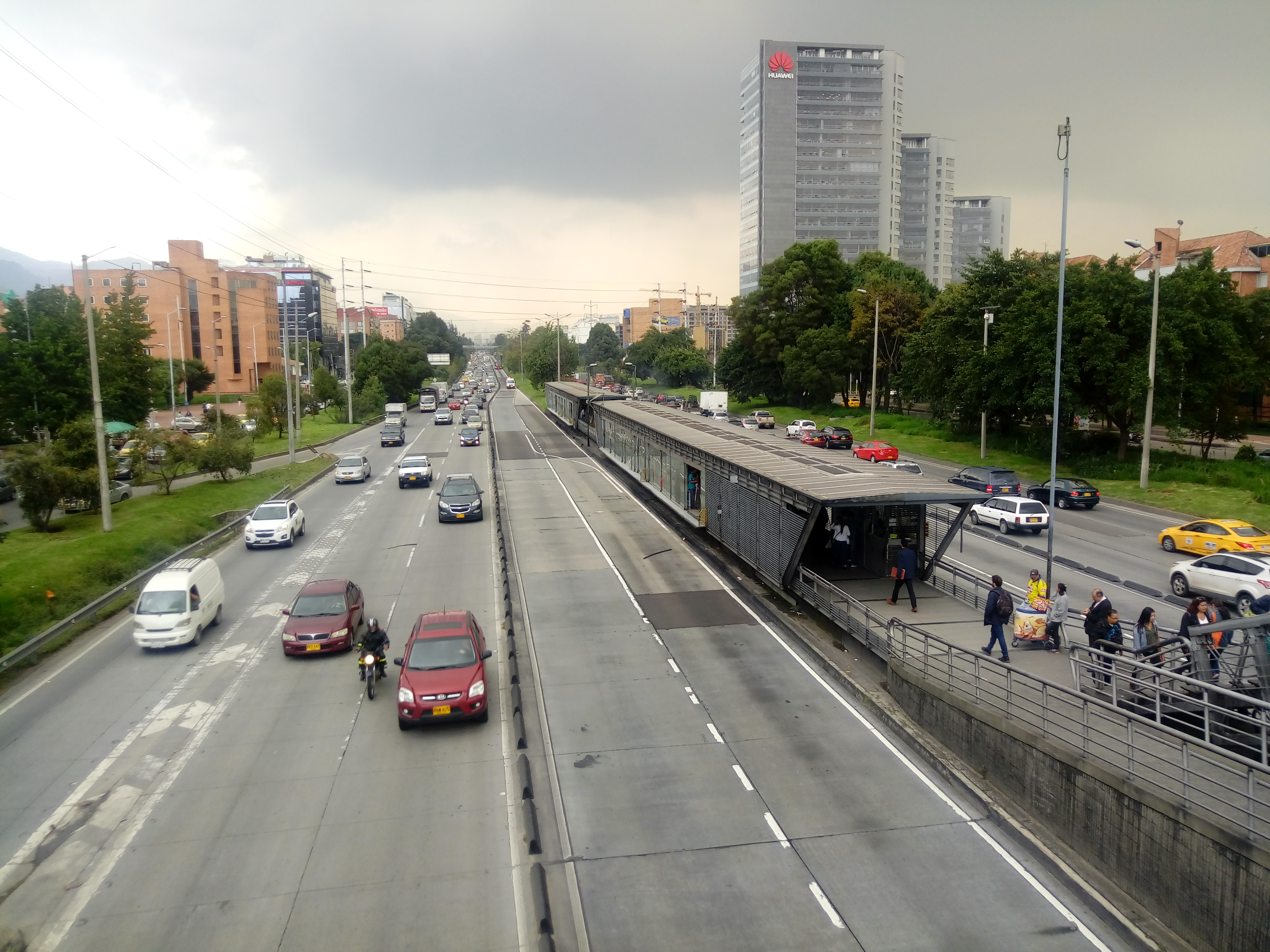

General information
- Location: Usaquén and Suba (Bogotá); Colombia

History
- Opened: 2001

Services
| Preceding station | TransMilenio | Following station |
|---|---|---|
| Calle 127 towards Terminal | B | Calle 106 towards Héroes |
Location

The simple station Pepe Sierra is part of the TransMilenio mass-transit system of Bogotá, Colombia, which opened in the year 2000.

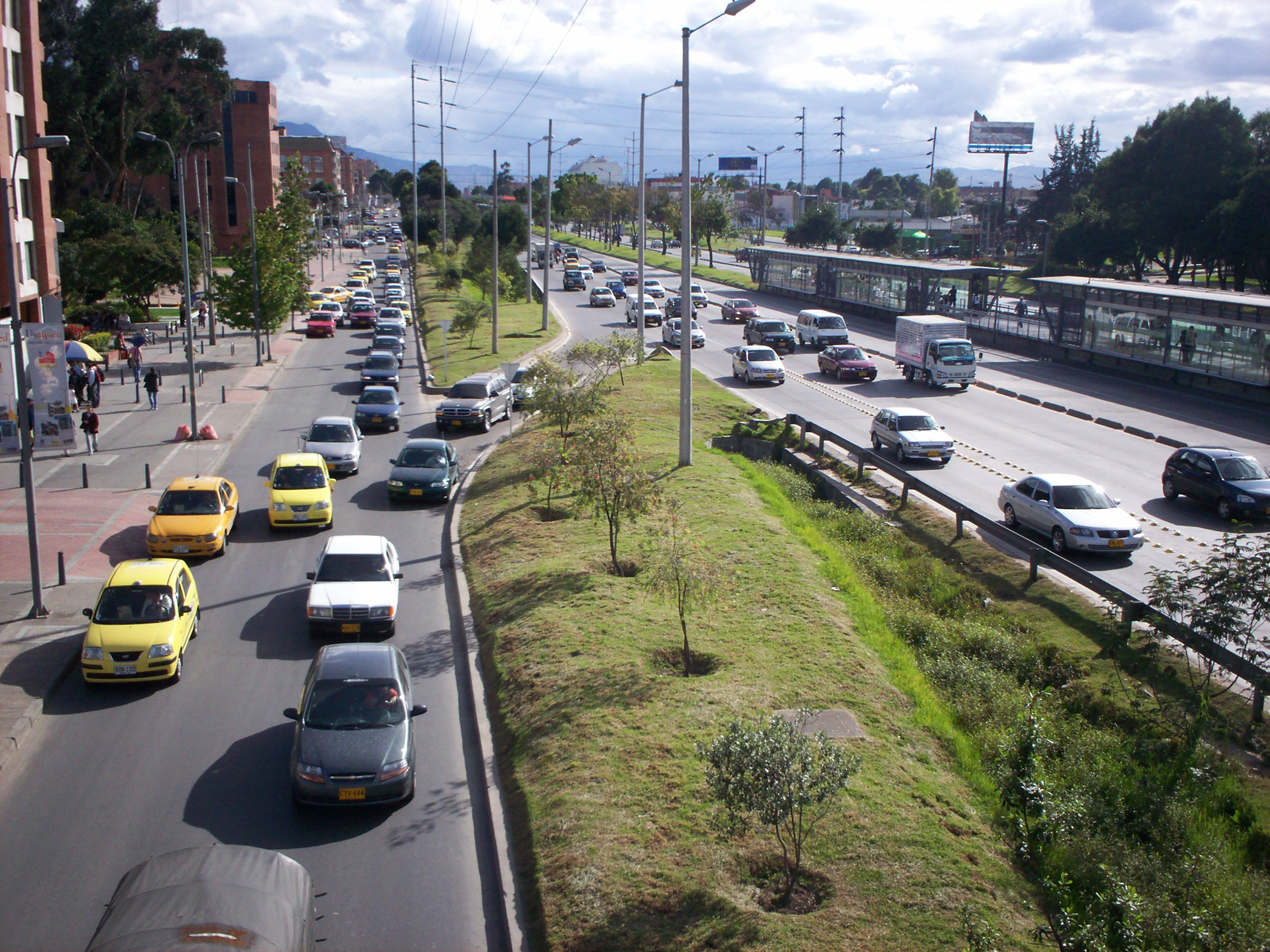

== Location ==
The station is located in northern Bogotá, specifically on Autopista Norte with Calle 115.

It serves the Alhambra, Malibú and San Patricio neighborhoods, as well as the commercial and financial area of Calle 116.

== History ==
After the opening of the Portal de Usme in early 2001, the Autopista Norte line was opened. This station was added as a northerly expansion of that line, which was completed with the opening of the Portal del Norte later that year.

The station is named Pepe Sierra due to its proximity to Calle 116, known as Avenida Pepe Sierra named after businessman José María Sierra.

End June 2003, an explosive went off on a bus arriving at this station. 70 passengers were able to get off before the articulated bus burned.

== Station services ==
=== Old trunk services ===
Services rendered until April 29, 2006
| Kind | Routes | Frequency |
|---|---|---|
| Current | | Every 3 minutes on average |
| Express | Expreso 50 Expreso 130 Expreso 140 | Every 2 minutes on average |

=== Main line service ===
Service as of April 29, 2006
| Type | Northwards | Southwards | Frequency |
|---|---|---|---|
| Local | 8 | 8 | Every three minutes |
| Express Monday through Saturday; All day | B10 / B11 / B18 / B72 | D10 / G11 / L18 / H61 | Every two minutes |
| Express Monday through Friday; All day | B16 | K16 | Every two minutes |
| Express Monday through Friday; Morning rush | | H51 | Every two minutes |
| Express Monday through Friday; Mixed service, rush and non-rush | B28 | F28 | Every two minutes |
| Express Sunday and holidays | B93 | H93 | Every 3–4 minutes |

=== Feeder routes ===
This station does not have connections to feeder routes.

=== Inter-city service ===
This station does not have inter-city service.

== See also ==
- Bogotá
- TransMilenio
- List of TransMilenio Stations
