= Calle 161 (TransMilenio) =

Bus station in Bogotá, Colombia

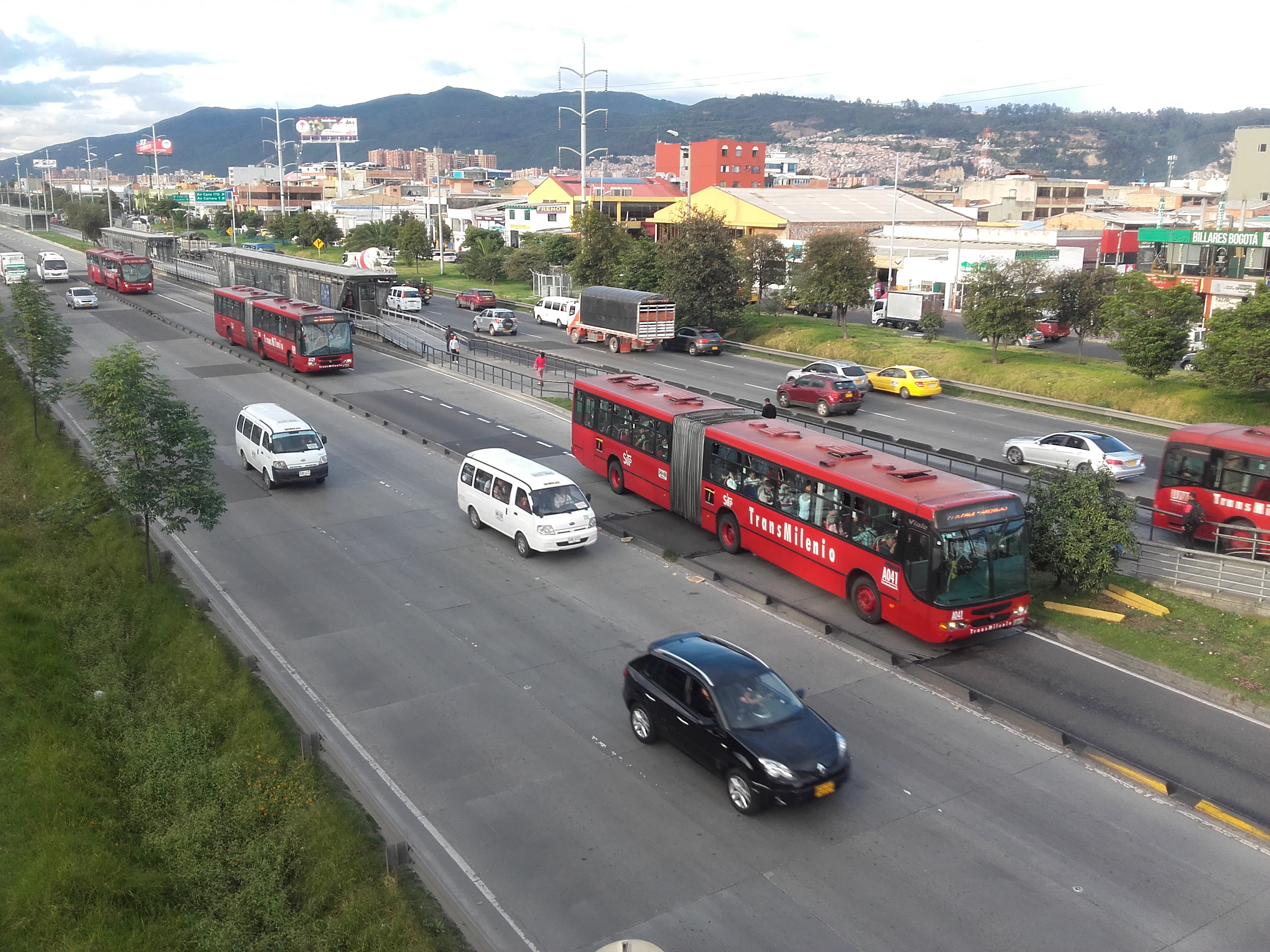

General information
- Location: Autopista Norte with Calle 161; Usaquén and Suba, Bogotá; Colombia

History
- Opened: 2001

Services
Preceding station	TransMilenio	Following station
Toberín towards Terminal	B	Mazurén towards Héroes

Calle 161 is a simple station that is part of the TransMilenio mass-transit system of Bogotá, Colombia.

== Location ==
The station is located in northern Bogotá, specifically on Autopista Norte with Calle 161.

It serves the Cantagallo, Las Orquideas and Estrella del Norte neighborhoods.

== History ==
After the opening of the Portal de Usme in early 2001, the Autopista Norte line was opened. This station was added as a northerly expansion of that line, which was completed with the opening of the Portal del Norte later that year.

The station receives from the street that is on the north side of it.

As of March 2019 changed the name of Cardio Infantil to the current name.

== Station Services ==
=== Old trunk services ===
Services rendered until April 29, 2006
Kind	Routes	Frequency
Current		Every 3 minutes on average

=== Main line service ===
Services since April the 29th 2006
Type	Northwards	Southwards	Frequency
Local	8	8	Every three minutes
Express Monday through Saturday; All day	B13	H13	Every two minutes
Express Monday through Friday; Mixed service, rush and non-rush	B50	C61	Every two minutes

=== Feeder routes ===
This station does not have connections to feeder routes.

=== Inter-city service ===
This station does not have inter-city service.

== See also ==
- List of TransMilenio Stations
