= Mazurén (TransMilenio) =

General information
- Location: Autopista Norte with Calle 152; Usaquén and Suba, Bogotá; Colombia

History
- Opened: 2001

Services
Preceding station	TransMilenio	Following station
Calle 161 towards Terminal	B	Calle 146 towards Héroes
Location

Mazurén is a simple station, part of the TransMilenio mass transit system of Bogotá, Colombia.

== Location ==
The station is located in northern Bogotá, specifically on Autopista Norte with Calle 152.

It serves the Las Margaritas and Mazurén neighborhoods.

== History ==
After the opening of the Portal de Usme in early 2001, the Autopista Norte line was opened. This station was added as a northerly expansion of that line, which was completed with the opening of the Portal del Norte later that year.

The station is named Mazurén due to its proximity to the Centro Comercial Mazurén and the Mazurén residential area. Also near the station are the Liceo de Cervantes and Calle 153.

== Station Services ==
=== Old trunk services ===
Services rendered until April 29, 2006
Kind	Routes	Frequency
Current		Every 3 minutes on average
Express	Expreso 60 Expreso 140 Expreso 150	Every 2 minutes on average

=== Main Line Service ===
Services since April the 29th 2006
Type	Northwards	Southwards	Frequency
Local	8	8	Every three minutes
Express Monday through Saturday; All day	B10 / B11 / B13	D10 / G11 / H13	Every two minutes
Express Monday through Friday; Morning rush		H51	Every two minutes

=== Feeder routes ===
This station does not have connections to feeder routes.

=== Inter-city service ===
This station does not have inter-city service.

== See also ==
- List of TransMilenio Stations
