= Suba Avenida Boyacá =

TransMilenio station in Bogota, Colombia

Suba-Avenida Boyacá

General information
- Location: Suba, Bogotá; Colombia

History
- Opened: April 29, 2006

Services
Preceding station	TransMilenio	Following station
Gratamira towards Portal de Suba	C	Niza Calle 127 towards San Martín
Location

The simple station Suba-Avenida Boyacá is part of the TransMilenio mass-transit system of Bogotá, Colombia. It is located on Avenida Suba, on a vehicular bridge, where it crosses Avenida Boyacá. Access to the station is from under the bridge. The station re-opened following its expansion and extensive renovation in 2022.

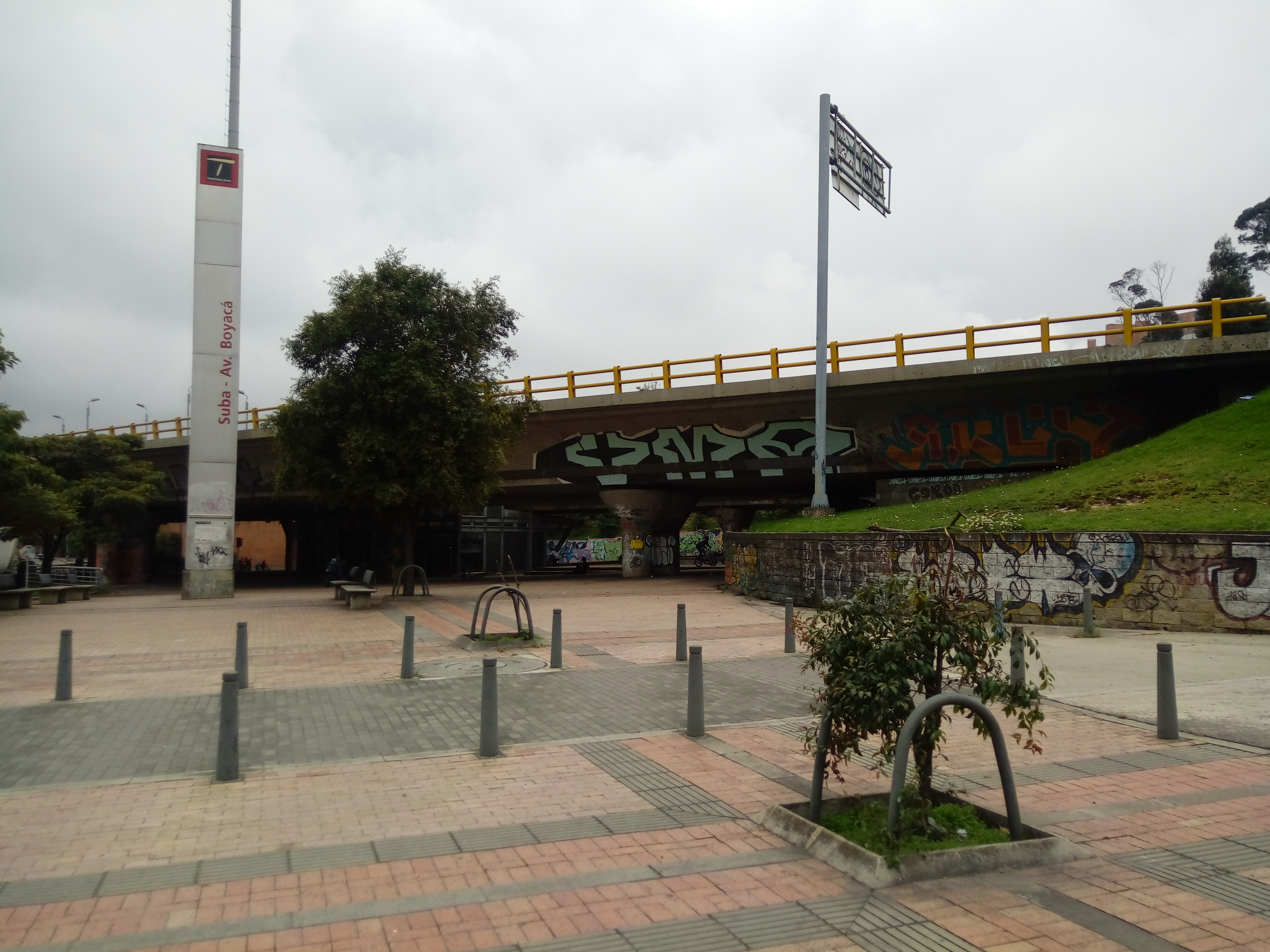
Suba Avenida Boyacá

== Location ==
The station is located in northwestern Bogotá on Avenida Suba at its intersection with Avenida Boyacá (Diagonal 129C).

It serves the Las Villas, Ciudad Jardín Norte, Calatrava and Altos de Chozica neighborhoods.

== History ==
In 2006, phase two of the TransMilenio system was completed, including the Avenida Suba line, on which this station is located.

The station is named Suba-Avenida Boyacá or -abbreviated- Suba Av. Boyacá for being located at the intersection of the two major avenues.

It was the first station in the system to be located on a bridge. In the lower part of the station, where two pedestrian bridges provide access to the station, there is a small plaza where payment for the system is collected. Passengers may reach the platform by elevator.

== Station services ==
=== Main line service ===
Service as of April 29, 2006
Type	Northern Routes	Southern Routes	Frequency
Local	7	7	Every three minutes
Express Monday through Saturday; Morning rush		J73	Every two minutes
Express Monday through Saturday; Evening rush	C73		Every two minutes
Express Monday through Saturday; Morning and Evening rush	C17 C30	H17 G30	Every two minutes
Express Saturday; All day	C17	H17	Every two minutes
Express Saturday of 5:00 a. m. to 3:00 p. m.	C30	G30	Every two minutes
Express Sundays and holidays	C96	G96	Every 3–4 minutes

=== Feeder routes ===
This station does not have connections to feeder routes (Spanish: Alimentadores).

=== Inter-city service ===
This station does not have inter-city service.

== See also ==
- Bogotá
- TransMilenio
- List of TransMilenio stations
- Avenida Suba
