= Gimnasio Alessandro Volta =

Italian school in Bogotá, Colombia

Location
- Calle 119 No. 4-79; Usaquén; Bogotá, 110111; Colombia; 4.69369°N 74.02795°W

Information
- Established: 2004; 22 years ago
- Website: www.gimnasiovolta.edu.co

Gimnasio Alessandro Volta is a private Italian international school in Usaquén, Bogotá, Colombia. It has scuola infanzia (preschool) through secondaria II grado (upper secondary school).

It was established in 2004.
