= Jardines de Paz =

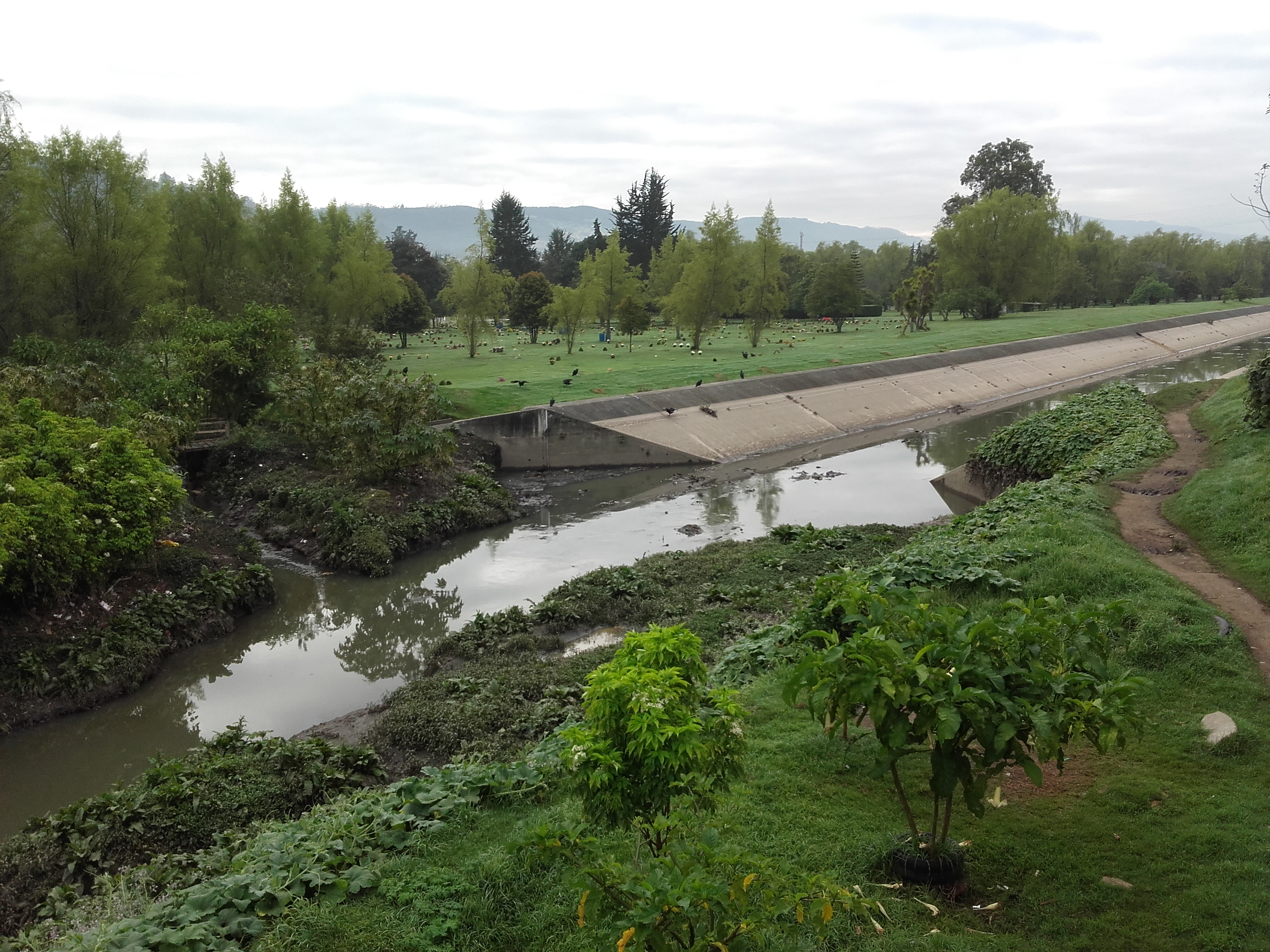
- Interactive map of Jardines de Paz

Details
- Established: 1970
- Location: Bogotá
- Country: Colombia
- Coordinates: 4°46′52″N 74°02′10″W
- Find a Grave: Jardines de Paz

Jardines de Paz is a cemetery located north of Bogotá. The cemetery was established in 1970, and has an area of 610,000 square meters, on the eastern side of the Autopista Norte with Calle 200. It has a sector for the military, a chapel, crematoriums, a cafeteria, and administrative offices.

== Notable interments ==
Some of the well-known individuals that were buried in the Jardines de Paz in Bogotá include:

- Jaime Garzón (1960–1999), comedian, journalist and politician
- Alberto Lleras Camargo (1906–1990), politician, President of Colombia (1958–1962)
- Carlos Lleras Restrepo (1908–1994), politician, President of Colombia (1966–1970)
- Germán Vargas Lleras (1962-2026) Colombian politician
