= Portal del Norte (TransMilenio) =

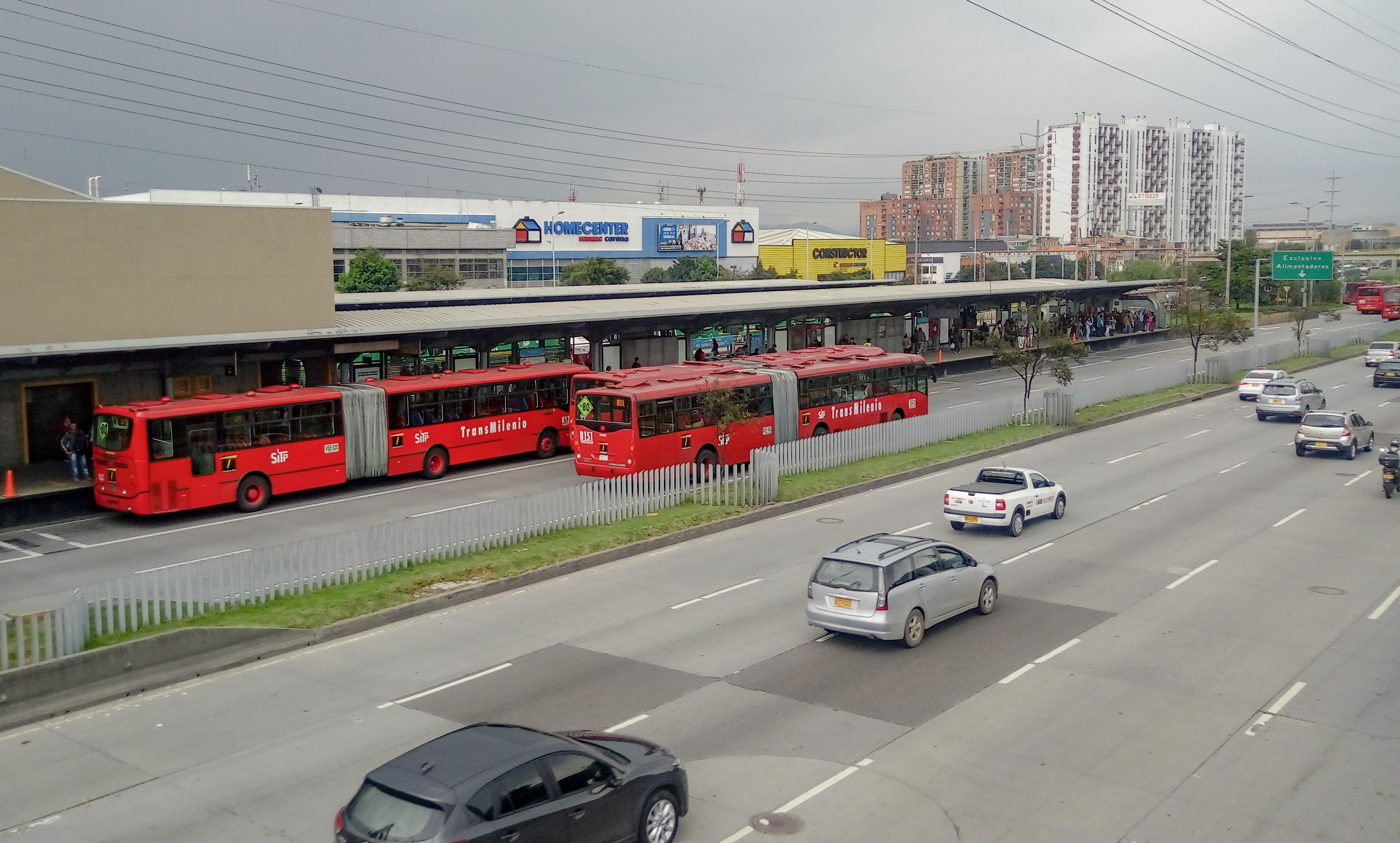

General information
- Location: Usaquén and Suba (Bogotá); Colombia

History
- Opened: February 2, 2002

Services
Preceding station	TransMilenio	Following station
Calle 187 towards Terminal	B	Toberín towards Héroes
Location

Portal del Norte is one of the terminus stations of the TransMilenio mass-transit system of Bogotá, Colombia, which opened in the year 2000.

== Location ==
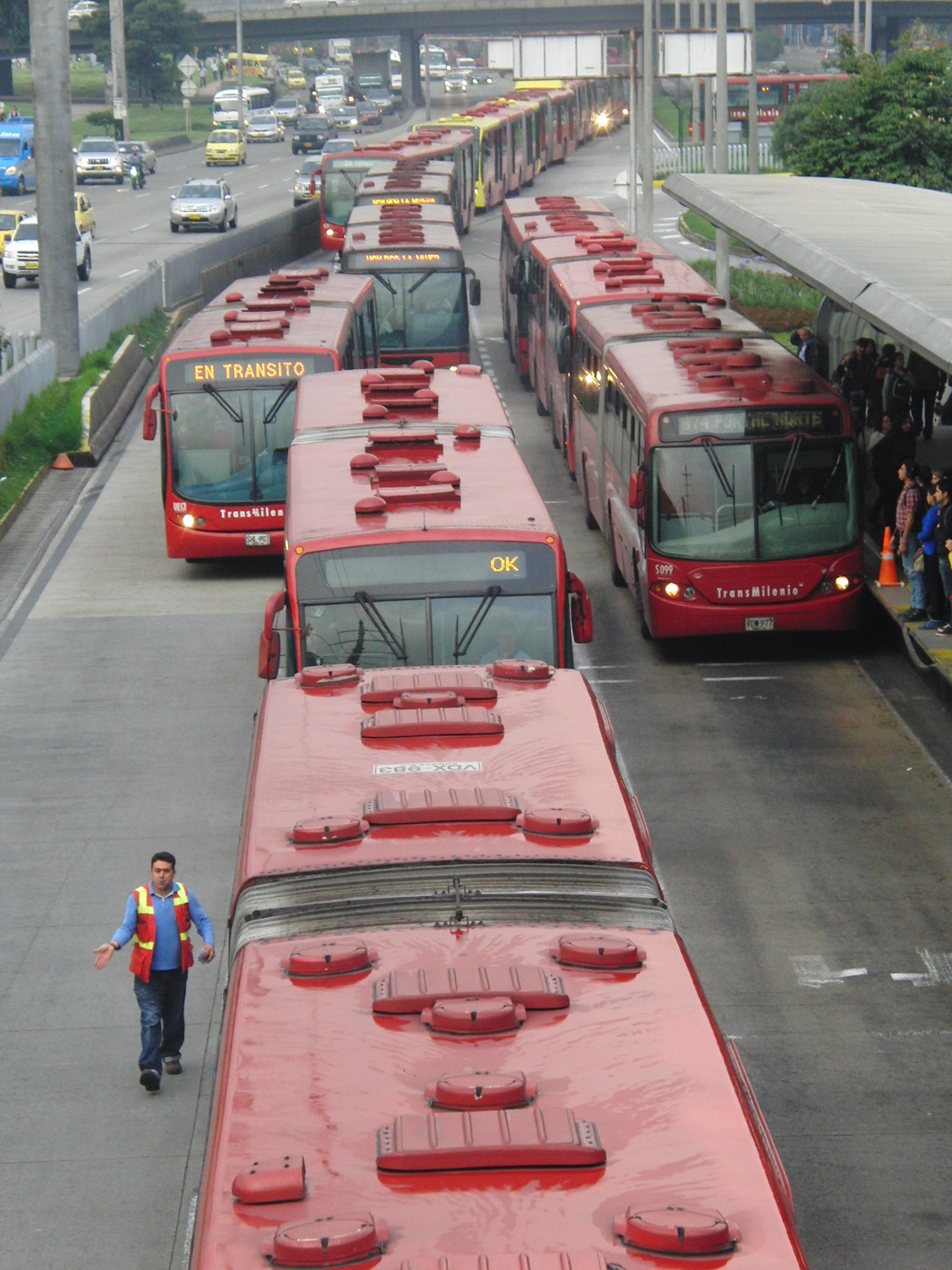
Rush hour on the TransMilenio BRT system at Portal Norte, Bogotá, Colombia. A marshall tries to clear the offside lane while buses queue out of sight.

Portal del Norte is located in northern Bogotá, specifically on Autopista Norte with Calle 175.

It serves the La Uribe, Villa del Prado, Nueva Zelandia, and Northwest San Antonio neighborhoods.

== History ==
In late 2001, after the opening of the Portal de Usme, the Portal del Norte was opened as the third terminus in the system.

Nearby there are Éxito and Home Center superstores, as well as a Colsubsidio and a small shopping center called Panama.

In mid-2005, its entire fleet of feeder buses made by Mercedes Benz and operated by Alnorte were renovated to be put into non-TransMilenio service. A new operator, Alnorte Fase 2 began service with new Volkswagen buses that bore the branding of Brazil's Busscar.

== Station services ==
=== Old trunk services ===
Services rendered until April 29, 2006
Kind	Routes	Frequency
Current		Every 3 minutes on average
Express	Expreso 50 Expreso 60 Expreso 70 Expreso 100 Expreso 130 Expreso 150	Every 2 minutes on average
Super Express	Expreso 400	Every 2 minutes on average
Express Dominical	Expreso Dominical 25	Every 3 or 4 minutes on average

=== Main line service ===
Services since April the 29th 2006
Type	Northwards	Southwards	Frequency
Local	8	8	Every three minutes
Express Monday through Saturday; All day	B10 / B12 / B13 / B14 / B73	D10 / G12 / H13 / F14 / H74	Every two minutes
Express Monday through Saturday; Morning rush	B52 / B71		Every two minutes
Express Monday through Friday; Morning rush		H51	Every two minutes
Express Saturday; Morning Rush	B28 / B71	F28	Every two minutes
Express Monday through Saturday; Mixed service, rush and non-rush		J72	Every two minutes
Express Monday through Friday; Mixed service, rush and non-rush	B27 / B28 / B50	H27 / F28 / C61 / H73	Every two minutes
Express Sunday and holidays	B90 / B92 / B93 / B94	G90 / H92 / H93 / D94	Every 3–4 minutes
Feeder/Inter-city			Every five minutes

=== Feeding services ===
The following feeder routes also work:

- 2.1 to the Mirandela neighborhood
- 2.2 circular to the sector of the Gardens
- 2.3 to the San Antonio neighborhood
- 2.4 to the El Codito neighborhood
- 2.5 to the San Cristobal Norte neighborhood
- 2.7 to the San José neighborhood
- 2.8 Circular Eastern Express 170 (Peak morning time)
- 2.10 circular to the neighborhood Verbenal
- 2.11 to the Andalusia neighborhood (Monday to Friday from 5:30 a.m. to 8:30 A.m only operates at rush hour)

=== Inter-city services ===
Portal del Norte also has inter-city services to Chia, Zipaquirá, Cajicá, Tabio, Tenjo, Gachancipá and Tocancipá.

== See also ==
- Bogotá
- TransMilenio
- List of TransMilenio Stations
