= Terminal (TransMilenio) =

Bus stop in Bogotá, Colombia

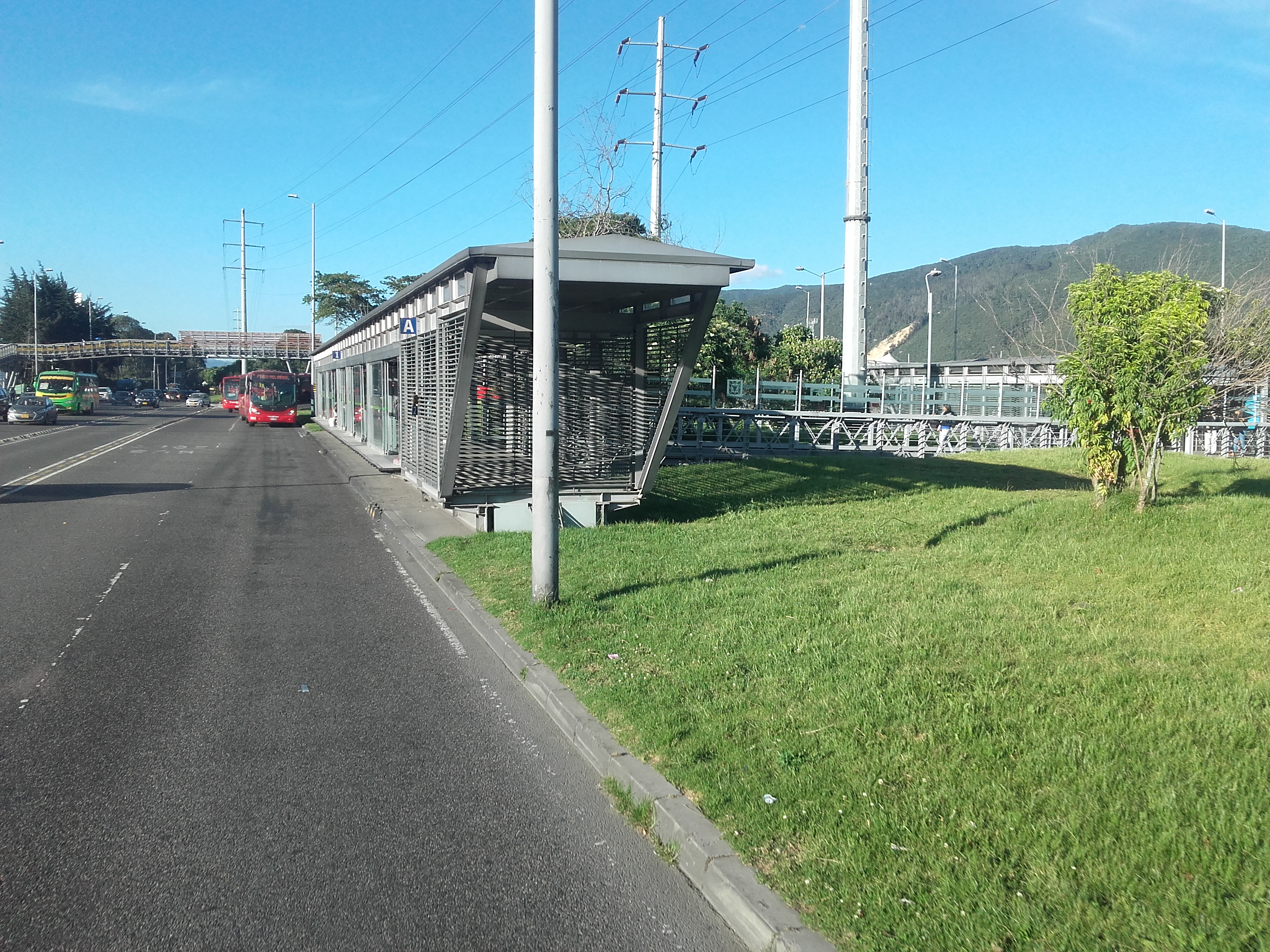

General information
- Location: Av.Carrera 45 with Calle 192; Suba and Usaquén; Colombia

History
- Opened: December 6, 2014

Services
Preceding station	TransMilenio	Following station
Terminus	B	Calle 187 towards Héroes
Location

The Terminal intermediate station is part of the mass transit system of Bogotá, TransMilenio, inaugurated in the year 2000.

== Location ==
The station is located in the north of the city, on the Autopista Norte between 190 and 192. It is accessed through a pedestrian bridge located a few meters south of 192 .

Serves the demand of the districts Casablanca Suba Urbano, Canaima and its surroundings.

Nearby are Santa Mariana de Jesus College, Cumaro warehouse, Tugó Autonorte furniture store, Autonorte McDonald's, San Andresito Norte Shopping Center and El Rancho Country Club.

== Origin of the name ==
The station receives its name due to the proximity of the terminal Satellite of the North, that is in the east side of the North Motorway. It is the bus terminal in Bogota that dispatches travelers to the departments of Santander, Norte de Santander and Boyacá.

== History ==
The works for the extension of the trunk of the Northern Highway began in 2009, year in which the avenue was extended from the street 182 to the street 192. The station was inaugurated December 6, 2014 after the delay in the construction of the pedestrian bridge that gives to the same one.

On the night of April 9, 2013, attacks against this system station were recorded. On that occasion, the stations Calle 100, Calle 106, Prado, Alcalá, Calle 142, Calle 146, Mazurén, Cardio Infantil, Calle 187, and Terminal with Autopista Norte, where they left $22 million Weights in losses

== Station Services ==
=== Trunk services ===
Services rendered since December 6, 2014
Kind	Routes that end in this station	Routes to the south	Routes to the West
Local	8	8	
Express Monday to Saturday all day	B11 B18	G11 L18	
Express Monday to Friday all day	B16		K16

=== Complementary service ===
The following complementary routes operate from September 21, 2015:

- 2.6 circular to the sector of Guaymaral.
- 2.12 to the Tibabita neighborhood.
- 18.3 circular to the Germania sector.
