= Usaquén =

- Locality of Bogotá
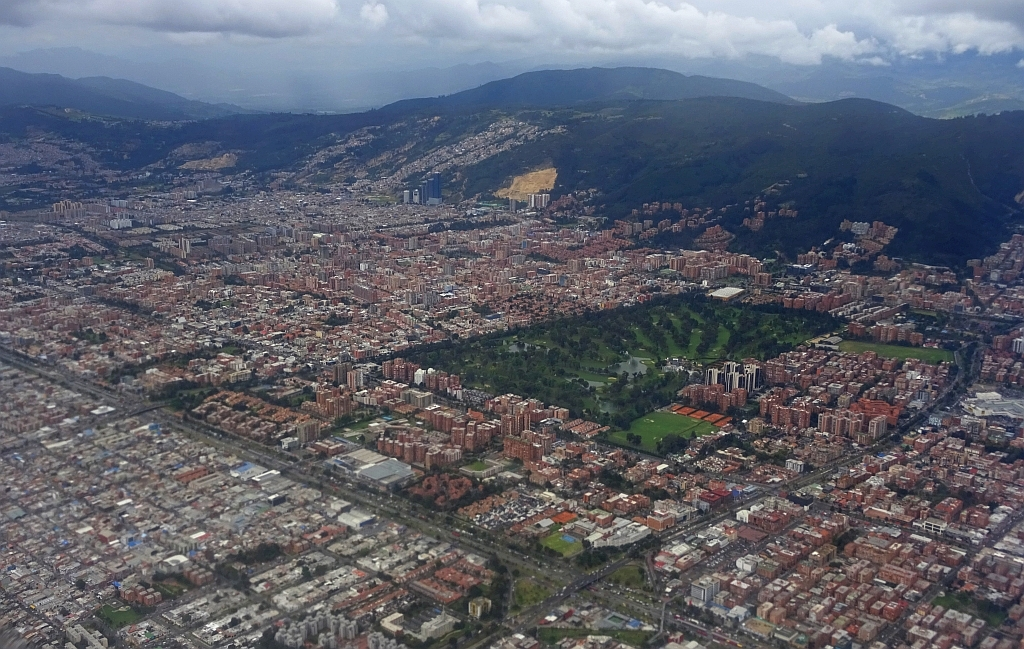
- View of Usaquén

- Seal

- Location of the locality in the city of Bogotá

- Location of the locality in the Capital District of Bogotá
- Coordinates: 4°43′11″N 74°02′12″W
- Country: Colombia
- City: Bogotá D.C.

Area
  - Total: 65.31 km^{2} (25.22 sq mi)
- Elevation: 2,650 m (8,690 ft)

Population (2016)
  - Total: 449,621
  - Density: 6,884/km^{2} (17,830/sq mi)
- Time zone: UTC-5 (Colombia Standard Time)
- Website: Official website

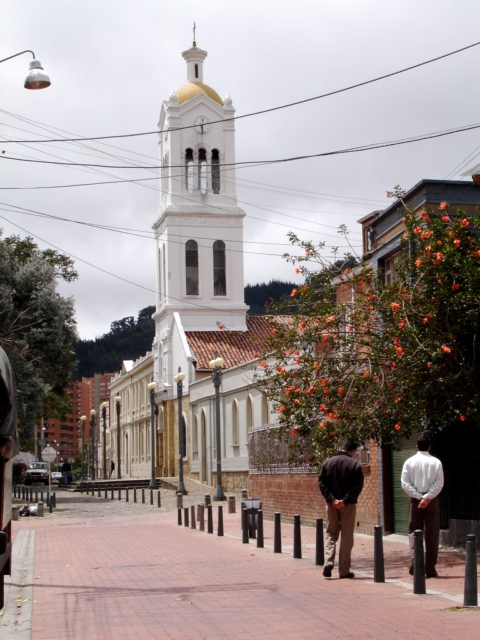
Church of Santa Bárbara de Usaquén

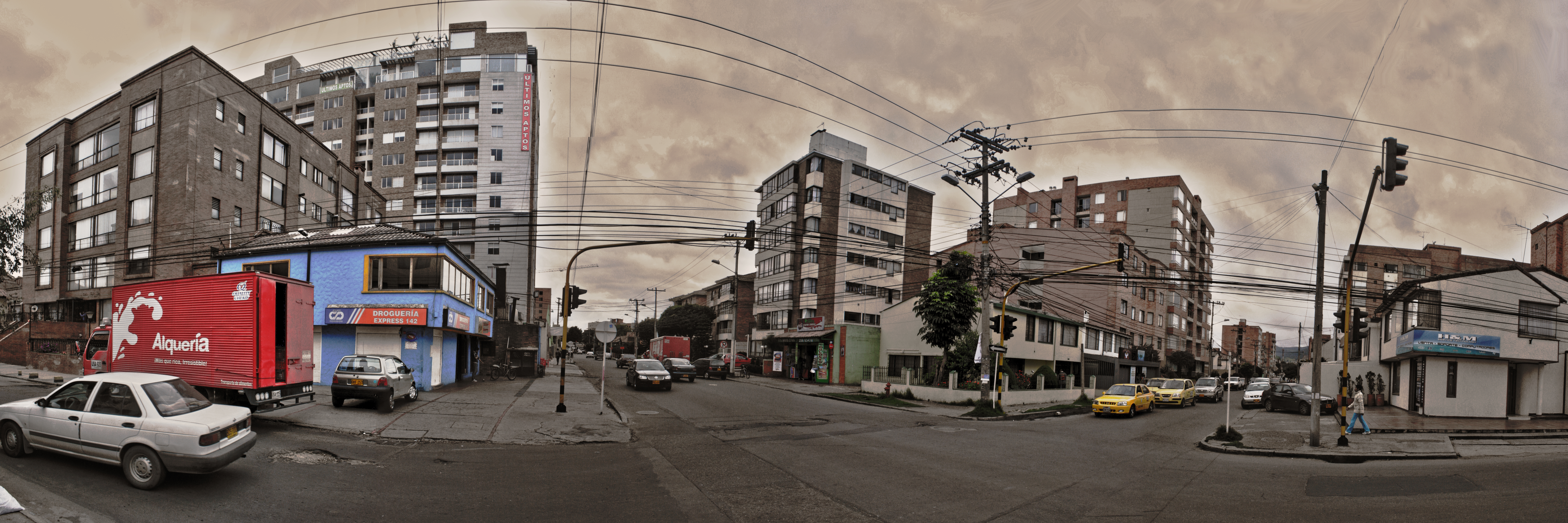
Cedritos

Usaquén is the first locality of Bogotá, capital of Colombia. It is located in the north of the city. This district is mostly inhabited by upper middle and upper class residents. It is designated as Bogotá's #1 locality, while being a separate municipality of Cundinamarca until 1954, when it was annexed into the city. Today, Usaquén is home to more than 480,000 inhabitants as projected by 2008. The Eastern Hills form the natural border to the east.

== General information ==
=== Borders ===
- North: The municipality of Chía
- East: The municipality of La Calera
- South: The locality of Chapinero
- West: The locality of Suba

=== Sites of interest ===
- The colonial quarter of Usaquén includes most of the buildings which belonged to the old municipality of the same name. These buildings are characterized by its Spanish colonial style architecture, similar of those in the La Candelaria neighborhood. Some important buildings in the area include: the Santa Barbara church (constructed in 1665 and modernized in the 20th century), the old country manor of the same name (now a mall) and the San José de Usaquén seminar and a variety of good restaurants.
- Country Club, the largest golf club in Bogotá
- Hacienda Santa Barbara, a colonial style Hacienda that now serves as a shopping mall
- Unicentro, Bogotá shopping mall, dating back to the mid seventies
- Santa Ana Centro Comercial, shopping mall
- Weekly Mercado de Las Pulgas (translated, Flea Market) - Takes place every Sunday on and around Plaza Usaquén. It is popular with local Bogotans as well as visitors. It is a place to shop for handicrafts, and various knick knacks. The main focus is on enjoyment. People come to enjoy the ambience. There is often entertainment on the square including bands, dancers, jugglers and mime artists. There is also a variety of local snacks and deserts available. Visitors often combine the visit with lunch on one of the many up-market restaurants in the area.
- La Aguadora Trail: La Aguadora is a hiking trail located in Usaquén, access is managed by The Bogotá Aqueduct Company. Ecological walks of this trail are conducted regularly by the District Institute of Recreation and Sports "IDRD"

== History ==
The name comes from the cacique Usaque, who was ruling the area of the southern Muisca as part of the Muisca Confederation. Usaque in Muysccubun means "under the pole". In 1537 conquistador Gonzalo Jiménez de Quesada and his troops arrived on the Bogotá savanna. Usaquén was abandoned by Spanish decree in 1777. It was gradually repopulated by people from Bogotá, and was host to some fighting during the war for Colombian independence. It was re-founded as a municipality in 1846, and in 1860 it was the scene of a battle between government troops and Tomás Cipriano de Mosquera. After winning that battle, Cipriano took power of the country.

Until 1954, the municipality covered 71 square kilometres (27 sq mi), starting from Avenida España in the south and ending 12 kilometres (7.5 mi) to the north along the road to Chía. It had traditionally been a spot for Bogotá's elites to maintain country homes. When it was integrated into the city, it maintained many of its municipal institutions, but with the supervision of Bogotá's mayor. Under the new constitution of 1991, Bogotá was reorganized into localities. Usaquén was numbered first of twenty.

On December 31, 1978, the guerrilla group M-19 took the military base called Cantón Norte, robbing the arsenal.

== Neighbourhoods and parks ==
=== Neighborhoods ===
Among the important neighborhoods are: Tibabita, Lijacá, Verbenal, San Antonio, El Codito, Servitá, San Cristóbal Norte, Toberín, Barrancas, Cedritos, Bella Suiza, La Carolina, Santa Ana, Santa Bárbara, San Gabriel Norte, Cantón Norte, Francisco Miranda, Las Margaritas, San Patricio and the colonial heart of Usaquén.

=== Parks ===
Torca, located at the extreme north, is the locality's largest park. The Country Club's polo area was acquired by the District and transformed into a metropolitan park for northern Bogotá.

== Education ==
Gimnasio Alessandro Volta, a private Italian international school, is in Usaquén.
