= TransMilenio =

Bus rapid transit system in Bogotá, Colombia

Coordinates: 4.6490°N 74.1086°W

- TransMilenio logo

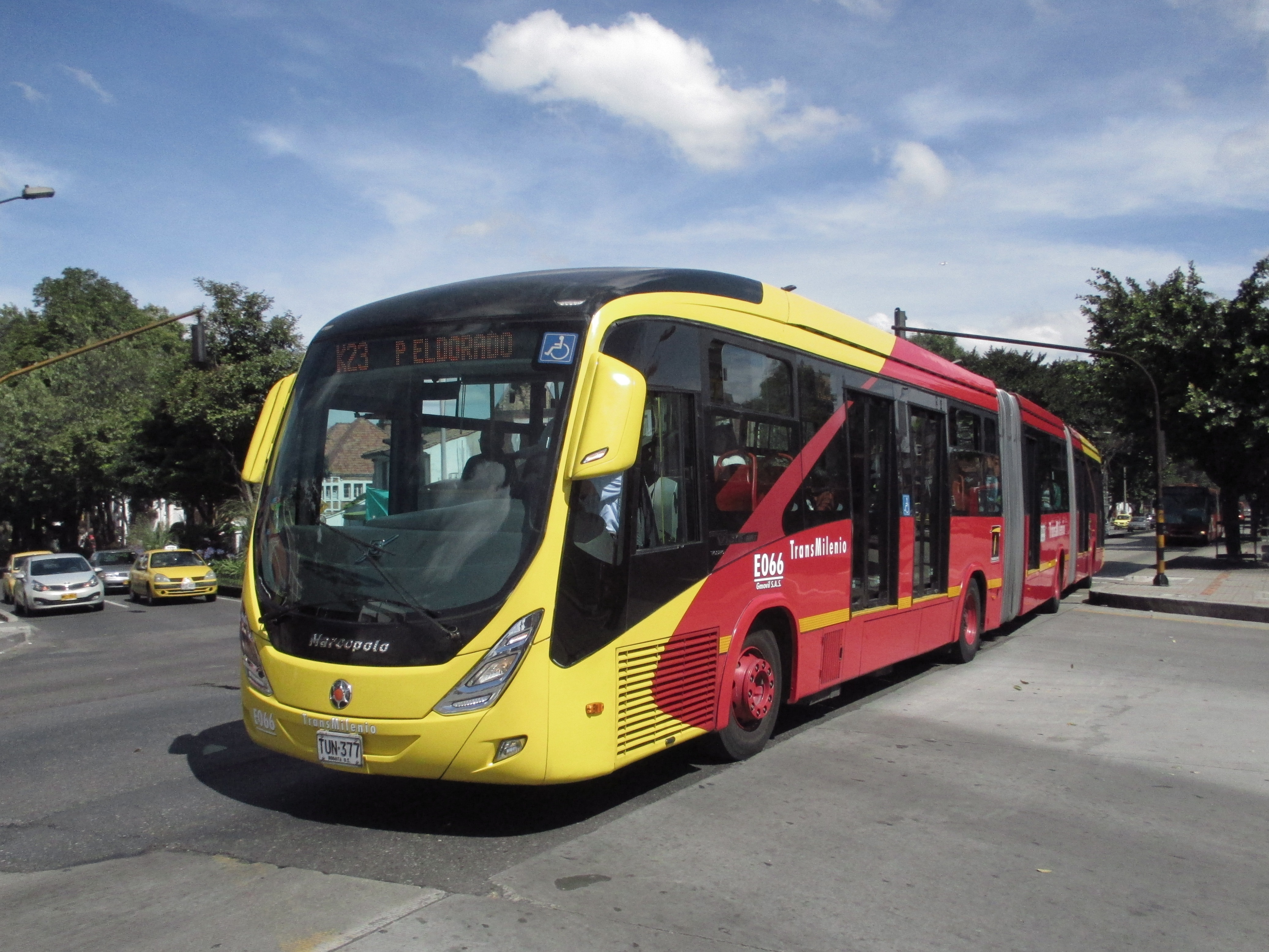

Overview
- Owner: Cities of Bogotá and Soacha
- Area served: Bogotá and Soacha, Colombia
- Locale: Metropolitan Area of Bogotá
- Transit type: Bus rapid transit; Gondola lift (TransMiCable)
- Line number: Phase I: Caracas; Autonorte; Calle 80; Caracas Sur; Eje Ambiental; Phase II: Suba; NQS Central; Américas; NQS Sur; Phase III: Calle 26; Carrera Décima; Carrera Séptima
- Number of stations: 143
- Daily ridership: 2 million (weekday 2025)
- Annual ridership: 578 million (2025)
- Website: transmilenio.gov.co

Operation
- Began operation: 4 December 2000; 25 years ago
- Operators: Consorcio Express; Gmovil; BMO Sur; Connexion Móvil; Somos K; SI18; Somos Bogotá Usme
- Character: At-grade street running
- Number of vehicles: 2203 (1320 bi-articulated, 610 articulated and 273 dual buses)

Technical
- System length: 114.4 km (71 mi)
System map
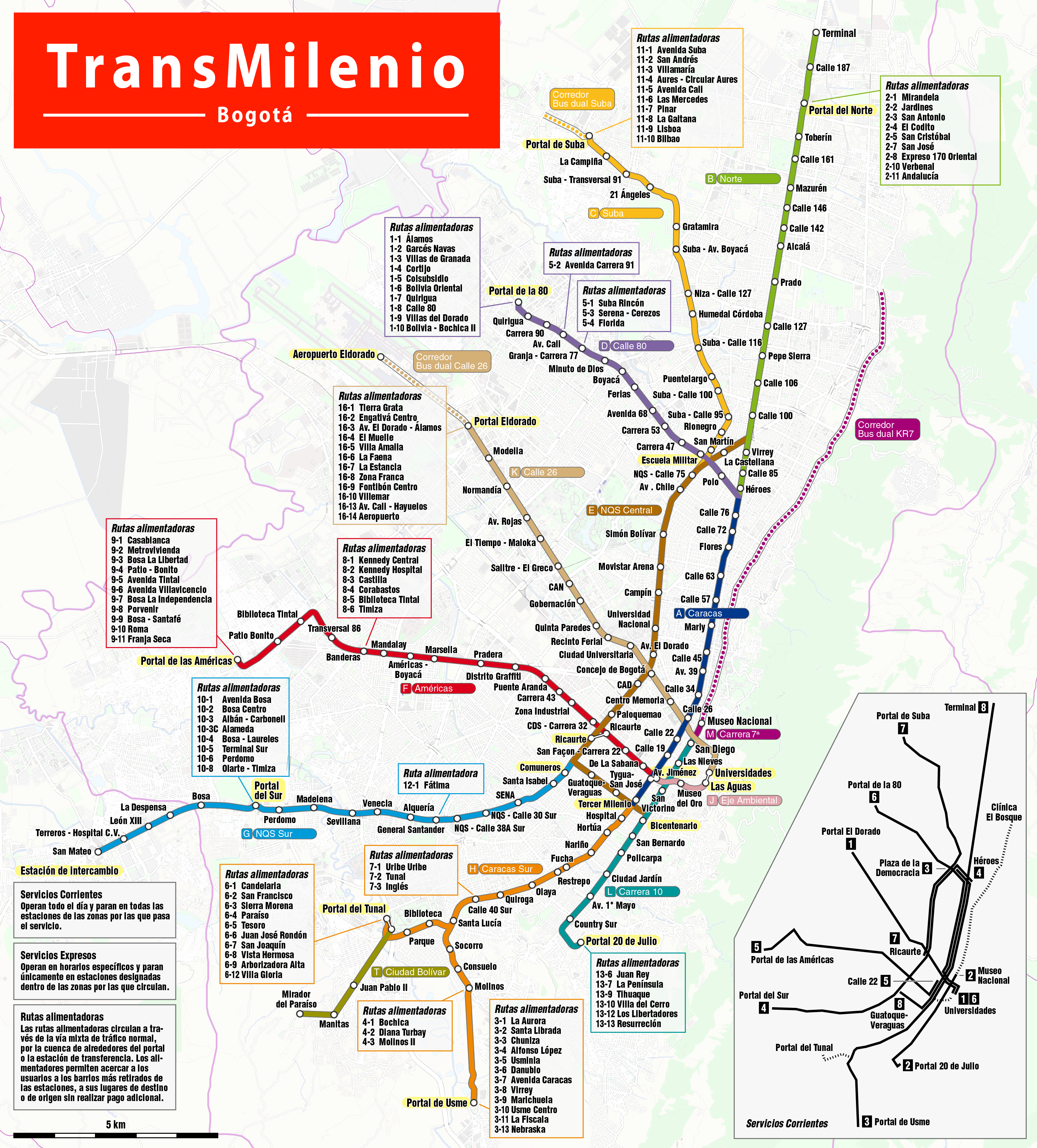

TransMilenio is a bus rapid transit (BRT) system that serves Bogotá, the capital of Colombia, as well as Soacha, a neighbouring city. The system opened to the public in December 2000. As of 2024, 12 corridors containing 99 bus routes totalling 114.4 km (71 mi) run throughout the city. It is part of the city's Integrated Public Transport System (Spanish: Sistema Integrado de Transporte Público; SITP), along with the urban, complimentary, and special bus services operating on neighbourhood and main streets.

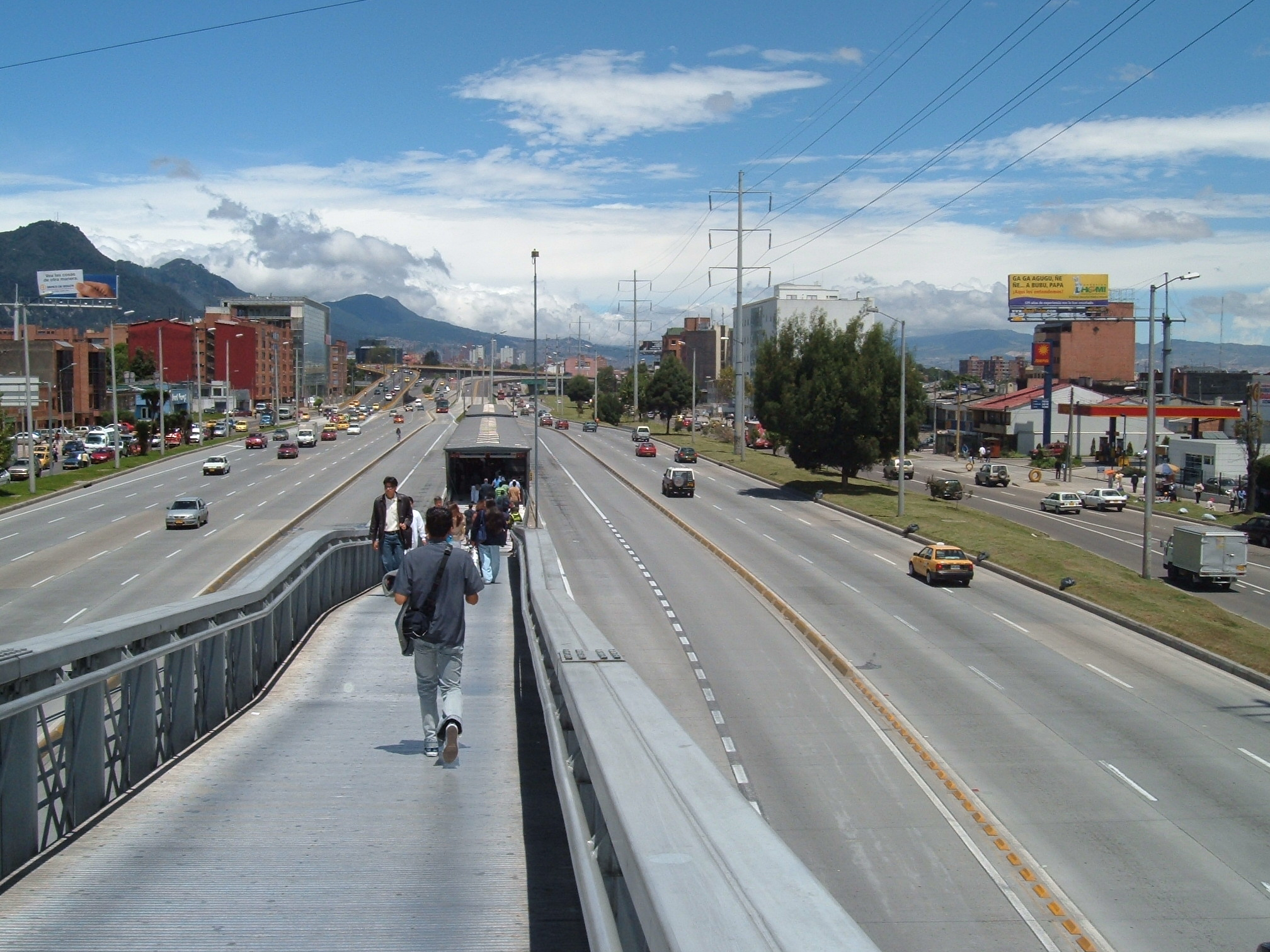
Calle 100 station

TransMilenio consists of several interconnected BRT lines, with raised floor stations in the center of a main avenue, or "troncal". Passengers typically reach the stations via a bridge across the street. Typically, four lanes down the center of the street are dedicated to bus traffic, with the outer lanes allowing express buses to bypass buses stopped at a station.

As of 2025, the trunk line system was circulating 1,825 buses on average. An additional set of 876 regular buses, known as "feeders" (alimentadores), carry passengers from certain important stations to many different locations unreachable on the main route. Unlike the main TransMilenio buses, feeders operate without dedicated lanes, are not articulated, and are either green or blue (regular TransMilenio buses are red). There is no additional fare to use the feeder buses.

There are 27 bicycle parking facilities in main TransMilenio stations with 7,351 parking spaces to facilitate cyclists using the system. Eight BRT corridors were certified in 2013 to meet the BRT standard with excellence: Autonorte and Caracas received silver certifications, while Americas, Calle 80, Eldorado, NQS, and Suba received gold.

== History ==
=== Background ===
Before TransMilenio, mass transit in Bogotá consisted of thousands of independently operated and uncoordinated mini buses. There was also a plan for a network of elevated highways throughout Bogotá, and plans to build a subway as Medellín had done several years prior. When Enrique Peñalosa was elected mayor he cancelled these projects and oversaw the construction of the initial TransMilenio system, significantly reducing costs relative to these proposals.

=== Construction and opening ===
The mayor oversaw the creation of a special company to build the project and run the central system. The operational design of TransMilenio was undertaken by transport consultants Steer Davies Gleave, with the financial structuring of the project led by Capitalcorp S.A., a local investment bank. Most of the money required to build TransMilenio was provided by the Colombian government, while the city of Bogotá provided the remaining 30%.

The first phase of TransMilenio opened in December 2000, three years after the project was initiated. It covered Caracas Avenue and 80th Street. Other lines were added gradually over the next several years. In 1998, Prior to the introduction of TransMilenio, a 30 km trip by public transport would take 2 hours and 15 minutes; the same trip using TransMilenio in 2008 took 55 minutes.

In the beginning, most buses were diesel-powered, purchased from manufacturers such as the Colombian-Brazilian company Marcopolo-Superior, Mercedes-Benz, Volvo, and Scania. The buses were articulated and had a capacity of 160 passengers each. In May 2007, a new, larger bi-articulated bus, with capacity for 270 passengers, was presented to the public.

Bogotá won the first Sustainable Transport Award in 2005 due to the BRT system, as well as the city's urban cycling strategy.

For two days starting May 2 2006, several groups of bus drivers not associated with TransMilenio held a strike, protesting against some elements and consequences of the system. They disagreed with the amount of monetary compensation that they would receive in exchange for the disposal of old buses (from 10 to over 20 years old), traffic restrictions on the TransMilenio main lines, and a new initiative called Pico y Placa Ambiental ("Peak and Plate Environmental") in some city areas, which would restrict the schedules of buses older than 10 years to early morning hours to reduce pollution in the city.

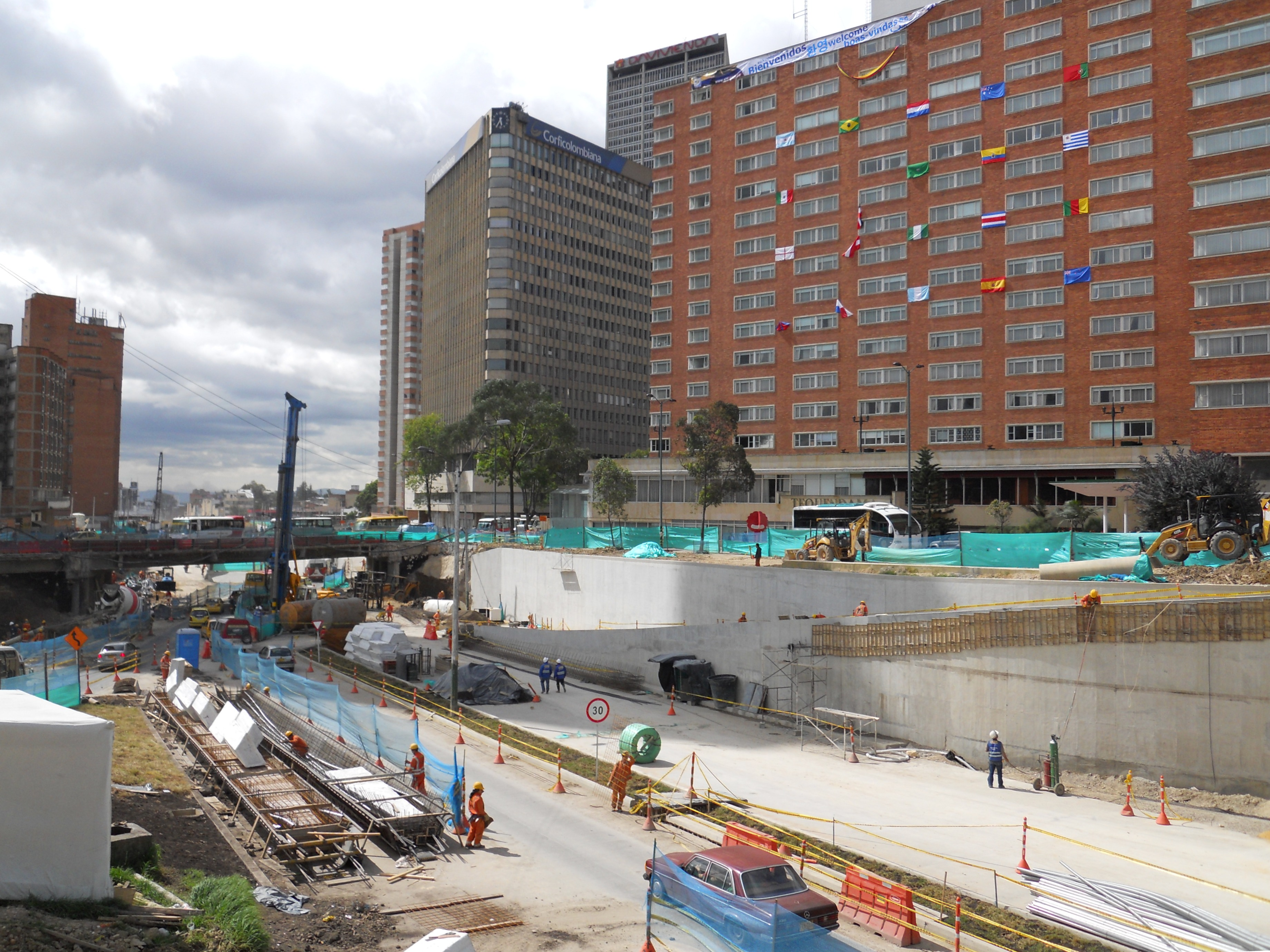
Construction of Line K on 26 Avenue

Since the May 2006 expansion, the TransMilenio route system has changed dramatically, with new sections added to the system.

Large-scale protests over deficiencies in TransMilenio erupted on March 9 2012. Hundreds of protestors, many of them students, looted and broke windows, as well as blocking several of Bogotá's main roads. Criticisms cited include relatively high prices, overcrowding, and delays along many routes. 11 were injured, and over half a million dollars in damage were done. The vandals were confronted and detained by riot police, who used tear gas as well as water cannons to combat the protestors.

At the end of 2018, Transmilenio ordered 1383 new buses to replace older models still in service. 52% were produced by Scania and ran on compressed natural gas, achieving a Euro 6 emission rating, while 48% were diesel-engined and made by Volvo with a Euro 5 emission rating.

Bogotá won the Sustainable Transport Award for a second time in 2022, due in part to the continued expansion and success of TransMilenio. A press release by the Institute for Transportation and Development Policy stated that "The City of Bogotá has assembled a fleet of 1,485 electric buses for its public transportation system—placing the city among the three largest e-bus fleets outside of China."

== Infrastructure ==
TransMilenio has 12 lines serving 152 stations in the cities of Bogotá and Soacha:

- A Caracas between Calle 76 and Tercer Milenio: 14 stations
- B Autonorte between Terminal and Héroes: 17 stations
- C Suba between Portal de Suba and San Martín: 14 stations
- D Calle 80 between Portal de la 80 and Polo: 14 stations
- E NQS Central between La Castellana and Tygua - San José: 13 stations
- F Américas between Portal de Las Américas and Avenida Jiménez: 18 stations (including Ricaurte station)
- G NQS Sur between Comuneros and San Mateo: 17 stations
- H Caracas Sur between Hospital and Portal de Usme and Portal del Tunal: 17 stations
- J Eje Ambiental between Museo del Oro and Universidades: 3 stations
- K Calle 26, between Portal Eldorado and Centro Memoria: 13 stations
- L Carrera Décima between Portal 20 de Julio and San Diego: 10 stations
- M Carrera Séptima: Museo Nacional: 1 station

Instead of being numbered, routes have a combination of letters and numbers. In order to fill the information gap, TransMilenio made available an interactive guide that includes routes, stations, nearby places, and route combinations.

Construction of a new line in Carrera 7 (North-Downtown) is under consideration. This has been criticized as there are certain locations where the system might not fit.

=== Vehicles ===
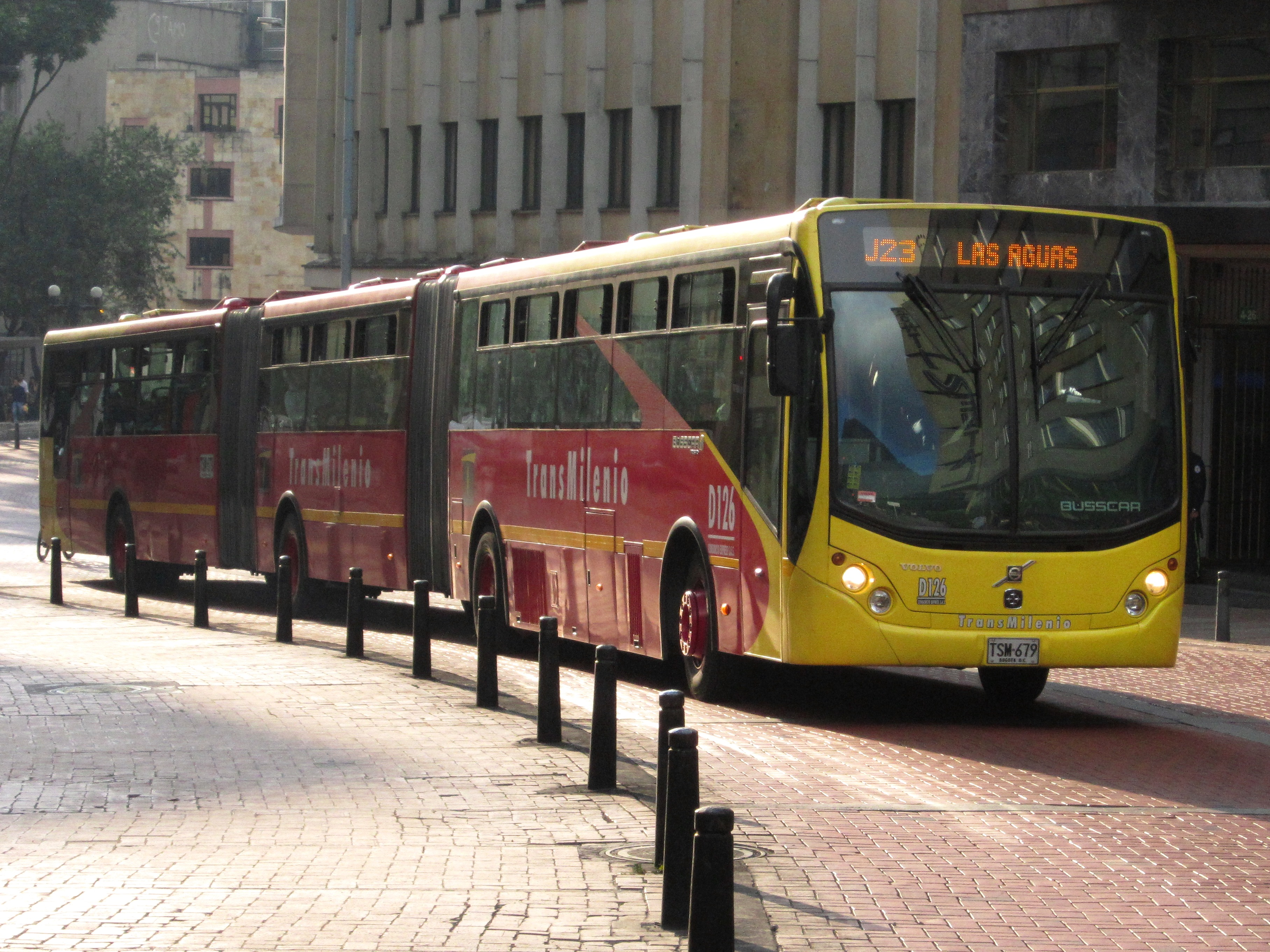
Bi-articulated bus on Avenida Jiménez

TransMilenio buses are not equipped with transponders to give them signal priority. Regret over this decision was voiced by the former general manager of the system, Angelica Castro.

=== Stations ===
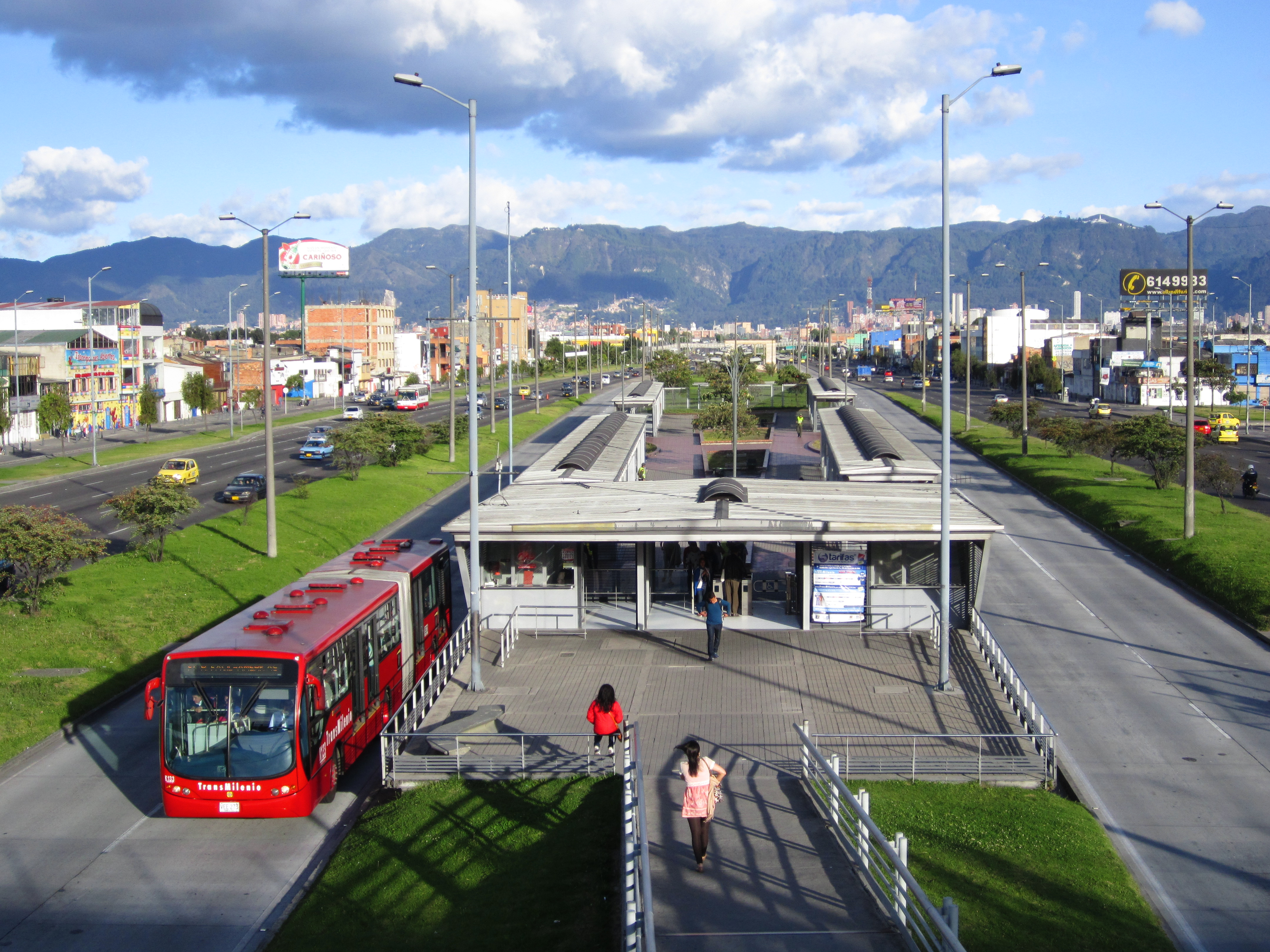
TransMilenio bus at a station

There are six types of stations:

- Sencillas (Simple): local service stations, located approximately every 500 m
- De transferencia (Transfer): allow for transfer between different lines via a tunnel
- Sin intercambio (No transfer): do not allow transfer between lanes (north-south, south–north, west–east, east–west); located in the Autopista Norte (due to a stretch of the road), Tunal and 6th Street ramification (due to water channels).
- Intermedias (Intermediate): service both feeder and trunk line routes.
- Cabecera (Portal): near the entrances to the city. In addition to feeders and articulated buses, intercity buses from the metropolitan area also arrive at these stations.
- Paraderos bus dual (dual-bus stop): located in the streets, these stops don't have turnstiles, electronic boards, and the floor level is the same of the street; served by buses with station-level and street-level doors. These stops are located in the pretrunk corridors (AK 7, AV Caracas, AV Suba, AC 80, AV El Dorado).

All stations have electronic boards announcing the approximate arrival time of the next bus. Wait times are short as there is usually a bus serving the station. There are also station attendants to provide assistance to the passengers, and posted system maps.

Users pay at the station entrance using a smart card, pass through a turnstile, and wait for buses inside the station, which is typically 5 m wide. The bus and station doors open simultaneously, and passengers board by walking across the threshold. The elevated station platform and the bus floor are at the same height.

TransMilenio stations comply with easy access regulations because they are elevated and have ramps leading to the entrance. The alimentadores (feeders) are normal buses without handicapped accessibility. A lawsuit by disabled user Daniel Bermúdez caused a ruling that all feeder systems must comply with easy access regulations by 2004, but this has not happened yet.

== Services ==
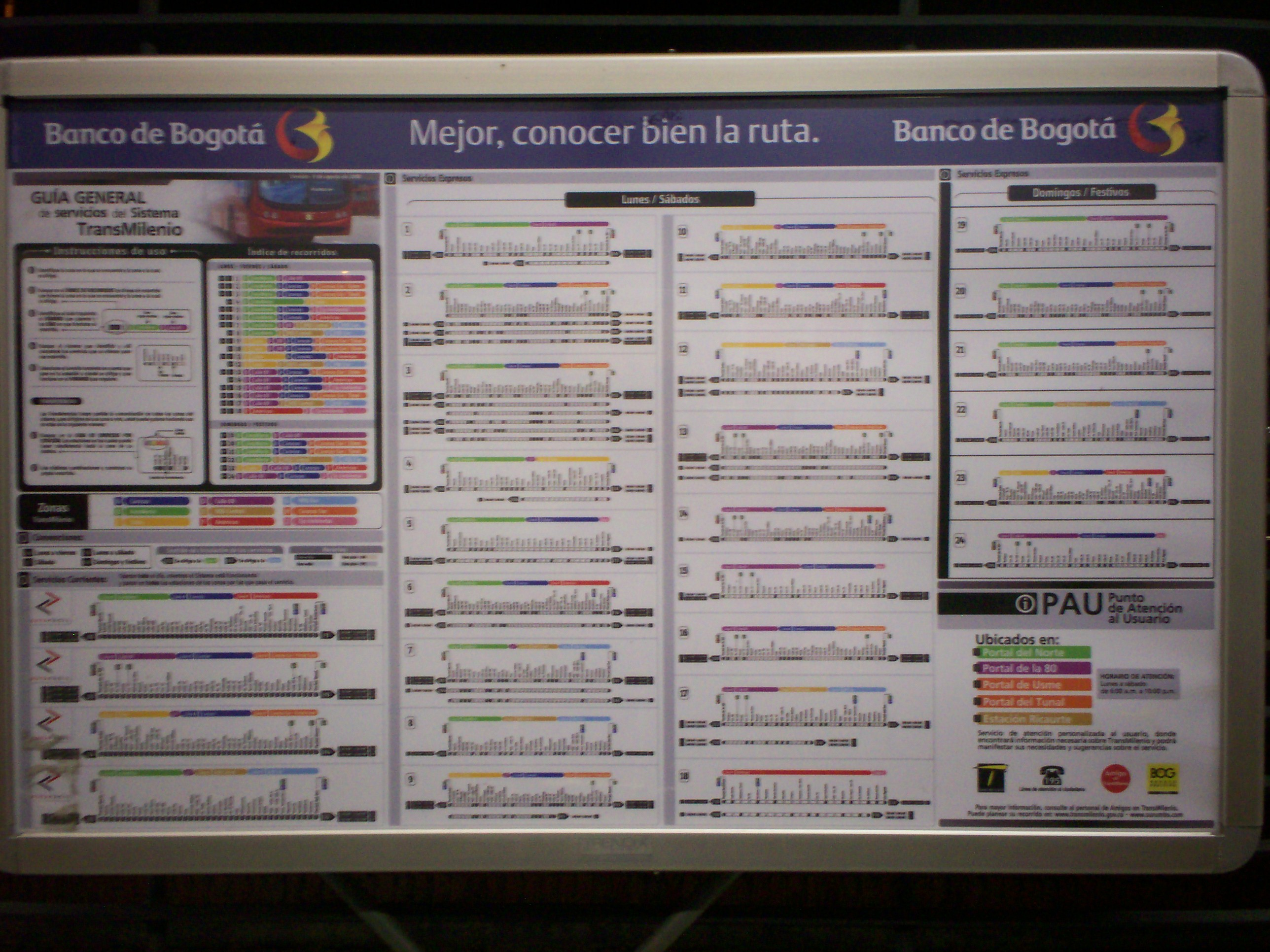
Bus plan at the Transversal 86 station in 2009

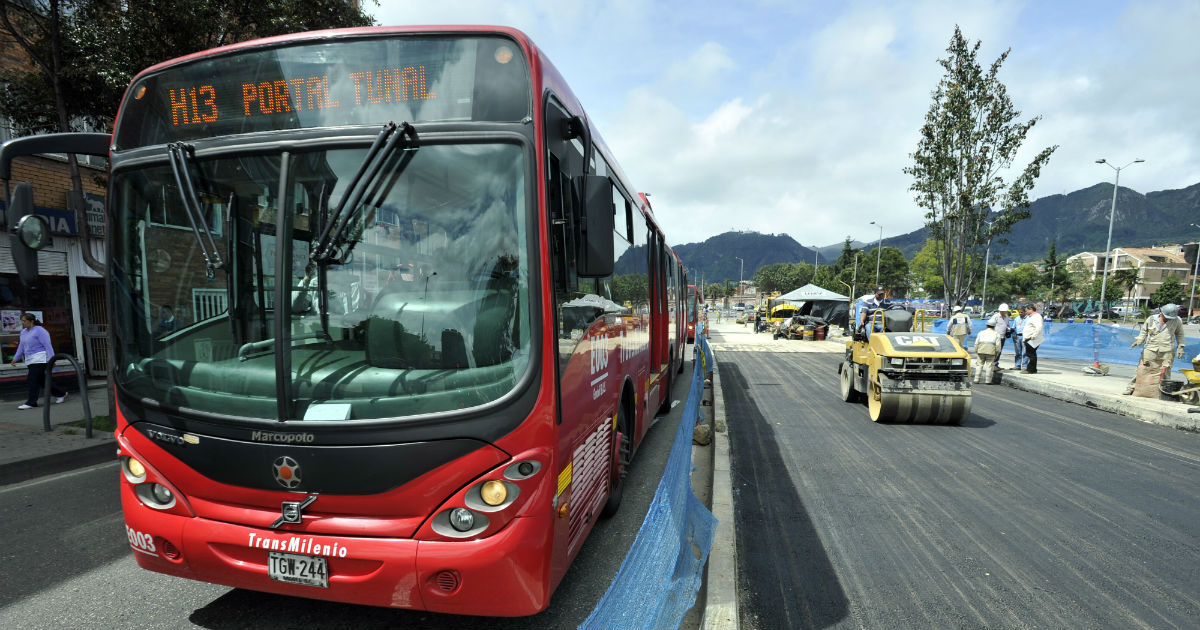
Articulated bus on route H13 in Avenida Caracas

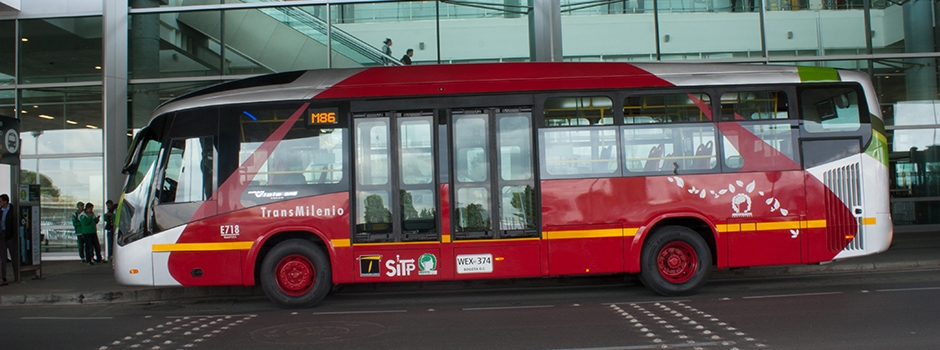
Dual bus driving the M86 route at the Airport

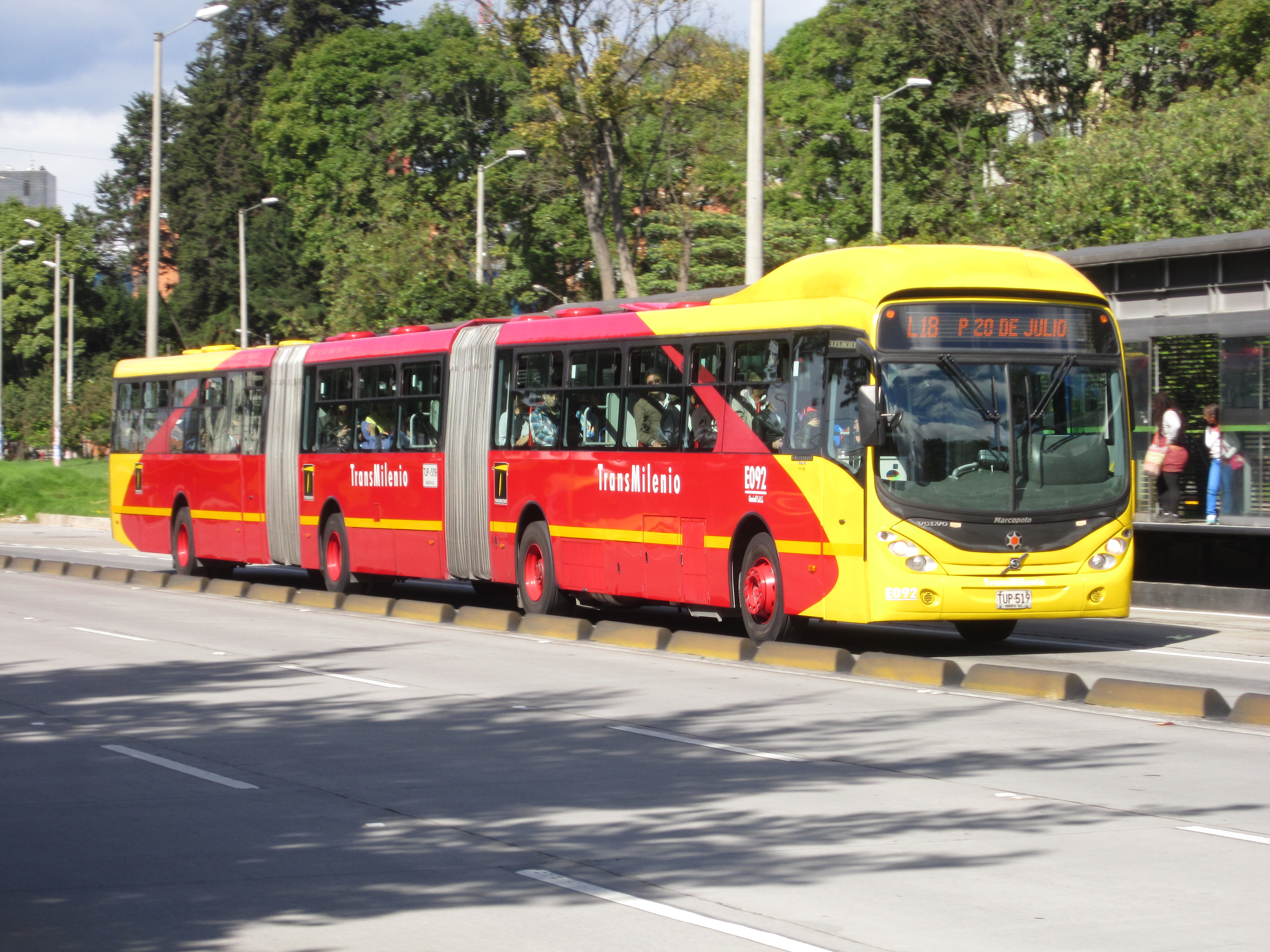
TransMilenio bus taking the L18 route on the North Highway

The zoning divides the trunks into 12 lines or zones that have different letters and colors. The maps changed at each station, to show the specific services to the station in question and the way to reach the other zones of the system from there.

The trunk system has three types of services:

- Regular Routes (Ruta Fácil): These are the numbered routes from 1 to 9 that stop at all stations and work all day. As of August 2008, this type of service was called the Easy Route. On June 17, 2017, these services were modified, replacing the routes that operated since 2006 by shorter trails, in addition to a change of nomenclature, which did not include the letter and the color of the destination area.
- Express (Expreso): Routes that only stop at the stations determined in their route, and are numbered from 10 to 76.
- Dual bus trunk (Troncal Bus Dual): Routes to extend the TransMilenio trunk service to arteries, beginning with the Carrera Séptima.

Services rendered since April 29, 2006
Type	North routes	South routes
Regular Routes (Ruta Fácil); All day	1 2 3 4 5 6 7 8	1 2 3 4 5 6 7 8
Express Every day All Day	A60 B10 B12 B18 B72 B75 C15 C25 D22 E32 E42 J23 K43 K54 M47 M83	D10 F23 F32 F60 G12 G22 G42 G43 G47 H15 H54 H72 H75 H83 L18 L25
Express Monday to Saturday; All day	B11 B13 B16 B23 B28 B74 C19 D20 D21 D24 K10 L41 M51	F19 F28 F51 G11 G41 H13 H20 H21 J24 J74 K16 K23 L10
Express Monday to Friday; All day	C17	H17
Express Monday to Saturday; Peak morning and evening time	B46	G46
Express Monday to Friday; Peak morning time	A52 A61 B50 B55 E48 J76	J70 J73
Express Monday to Friday; Peak evening time	C73	C50 D55 F26 F61 G48 G52 H76
Express Monday to Saturday; Peak morning time	B26 G45	G45
Express Monday to Friday; Peak morning and evening time	B27 C30 G45	G30 G45 H27
Express Saturdays from 4:00 a.m. to 3:00 p.m.	C17	
Express Saturdays from 12:00 p.m. to 6:00 p.m.		F26
Express Saturdays from 5:00 a.m. to 3:00 p.m.	C30	G30 H17
Dual Every day All day	C84D81M82M86P85	K86L81L82M84M85
Alimentador - Intermunicipal	1.1 1.2 1.3 1.4 1.5 1.6 1.7 1.8 1.9 1.10 2.1 2.2 2.3 2.4 2.5 2.7 2.8 2.10 2.11 3.1 3.2 3.3 3.4 3.5 3.6 3.7 3.8 3.9 3.10 3.11 3.13 4.1 4.2 4.3 5.1 5.2 5.3 5.4 6.1 6.2 6.3 6.4 6.5 6.6 6.7 6.8 6.9 6.12 7.1 7.2 7.3 8.1 8.2 8.3 8.4 8.5 8.6 9.1 9.2 9.3 9.4 9.5 9.6 9.7 9.8 9.9 9.10 9.11 10.1 10.2 10.3 10.3C 10.4 10.5 10.6 10.8 11.1 11.2 11.3 11.4 11.5 11.6 11.7 11.8 11.9 11.10 12.1 13.6 13.7 13.9 13.10 13.12 13.13 16.1 16.2 16.3 16.4 16.5 16.6 16.7 16.8 16.9 16.10 16.13 16.14	

== Fares and tickets ==
The fare as of 2026 is 3,550 Colombian pesos for a single trip (about €0.7 or US$0.75). Cards use a contactless smart card (MIFARE) system, and multiple trips may be purchased using one card.

Fare of TransMilenio
Year	Rush hour COP	Regular hour COP
2026	$3550	
2025	$3200	
2023–2024	$2950	
2022	$2650	
2021	$2500	
2020	$2500	
2019	$2400	
2018	$2300	
2017	$2200	
2016	$2000	
2015	$1800	
2014	$1800	$1500
2013	$1700	$1400
2012	$1700	
2011	$1750	
2010	$1700	
2009	$1600	
2008	$1500	
2007	$1400	
2006	$1300	
2005	$1200	
2004	$1200	
2003	$1100	
2002	$1000	
October 2001	$900	
February 2001	$850	
2000	$800	

== Costs, ridership, and impact ==
According to a United States Transportation Research Board (TRB) case study report, the initial construction cost for the first 41 km of TransMilenio routes was US$240 million, or US$5.85 million/km. In a report presented later by the Ministry of Transport of Colombia, the total cost of construction for phase one was estimated at COL$1.4 billion (about US$703 million), of which COL$253.053 million (about US$126.5 million) was provided by the Colombian government.

The construction of the second phase was estimated at COL$3.2 billion (about US$1634 million), of which COL$2.1 billion (about US$1058 million) was provided by the Colombian government, with the rest being provided by the city. The numbers of this report are calculated in money of 2009.

The system is overseen by a public body, which awards contracts to private bus companies on a competitive basis. According to TRB, private contractors are paid based on the total number of kilometers that their vehicles operate.

Daily ridership quickly reached 800,000 after the system opened. TransMilenio has since been expanded, with ridership up to 1,050,000 by early 2006. In 2009 it had reached 1,400,000 daily, and by September 2018 a weekday would see 2.4 million passengers. Other cities have since adopted systems modelled on TransMilenio, including the Mexico City Metrobús, as well as Red Metropolitana de Movilidad (previously known as Transantiago) in Santiago, Chile. Most of these, however, are complemented with a traditional rapid transit system.

== Controversies ==
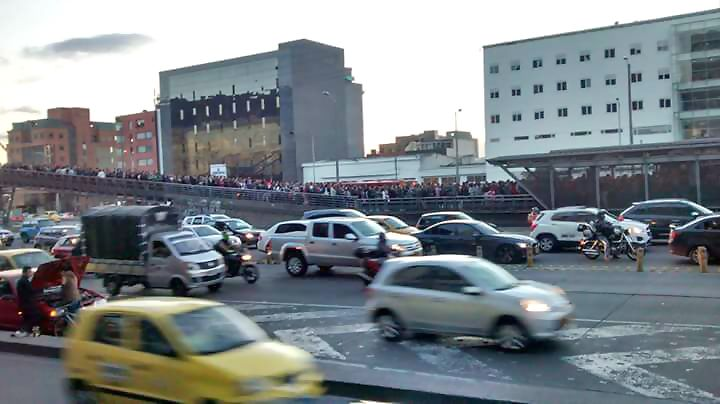
Users lining up to access Calle 100 Station, due to overcrowding

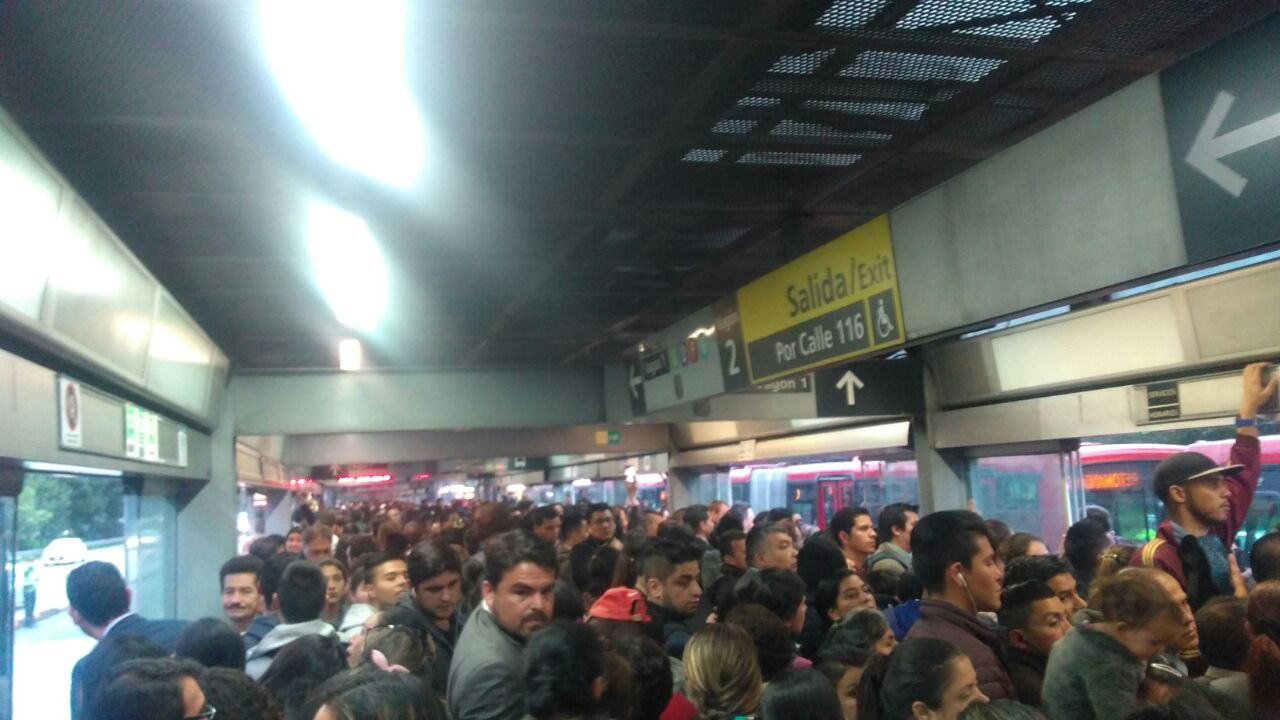
Pepe Sierra station at rush hour

=== User strikes ===
In 2016, TransMilenio had an 86% disapproval rating from users. User strikes erupted over poor service quality, with users blocking bus lanes and at times halting the entire system. These protests sometimes devolved into riots, involving heavy police presence and the use of crowd control measures such as tear gas and water cannons.

=== Overcrowding ===
The system was described by users, independent bodies and the media as suffering from overcrowding, with an average of eight passengers per square meter. It has also been criticised for its lack of security, and for providing bad customer service. During rush hours, it was so crowded that "stations are so packed that people can't get off the bus". In some stations, overcrowding was so severe that users had to wait in a long line to top up their Smart card and another line to enter the station. According to official data in 2017, there were 3,404 thefts in TransMilenio stations, and 1,442 more on buses.

=== Construction ===
During construction, there were problems with the concrete used to pave the dedicated roads, which had an estimated cost to the city of COL$1.6 trillion (US$500 million). In 2012, Bogota's secretary of finance said that the line built along Avenida Caracas should be rebuilt, as well as some parts of the Avenida 26 line.

=== Air pollution ===
A study conducted by the National University of Colombia in 2015 revealed that 70% of the air pollution near TransMilenio exits had been caused by the buses put into service during the first phase of the service's rollout. According to official data, more than 50% of the first and second phase buses broke atmospheric emissions rules. Concerns were also raised by academics, councillors, and citizens around the fact that many TransMilenio buses were diesel-powered, due to the risk of lung cancer posed by their exhaust fumes.

=== Sexual assaults ===
Women in Bogotá have stated that the overcrowding in the system makes it easy for criminals to attack women and go unnoticed. According to a 2012 survey conducted by the Secretary for Women's Issues of Bogotá, 64% of women reported they have been victims of sexual assault while using TransMilenio services. Several policies have been adopted in order to confront this problem, like an exclusive bus for women, and special undercover policewomen, however TransMilenio continued to face reports of sexual assaults as of 2018.

=== Broken buses ===
Throughout 2017 and 2018, TransMilenio buses received criticism for a variety of incidents involving buses facing serious mechanical problems while in service. This included buses being burned due to mechanical problems, a bus being broken in half, tires flying off buses and hitting cars, and passengers reporting water leaking into buses during rain.

== See also ==
- List of bus rapid transit systems
- TransMiCable
- Transjakarta
