= Autopista Norte =

Road in Bogotá, Colombia

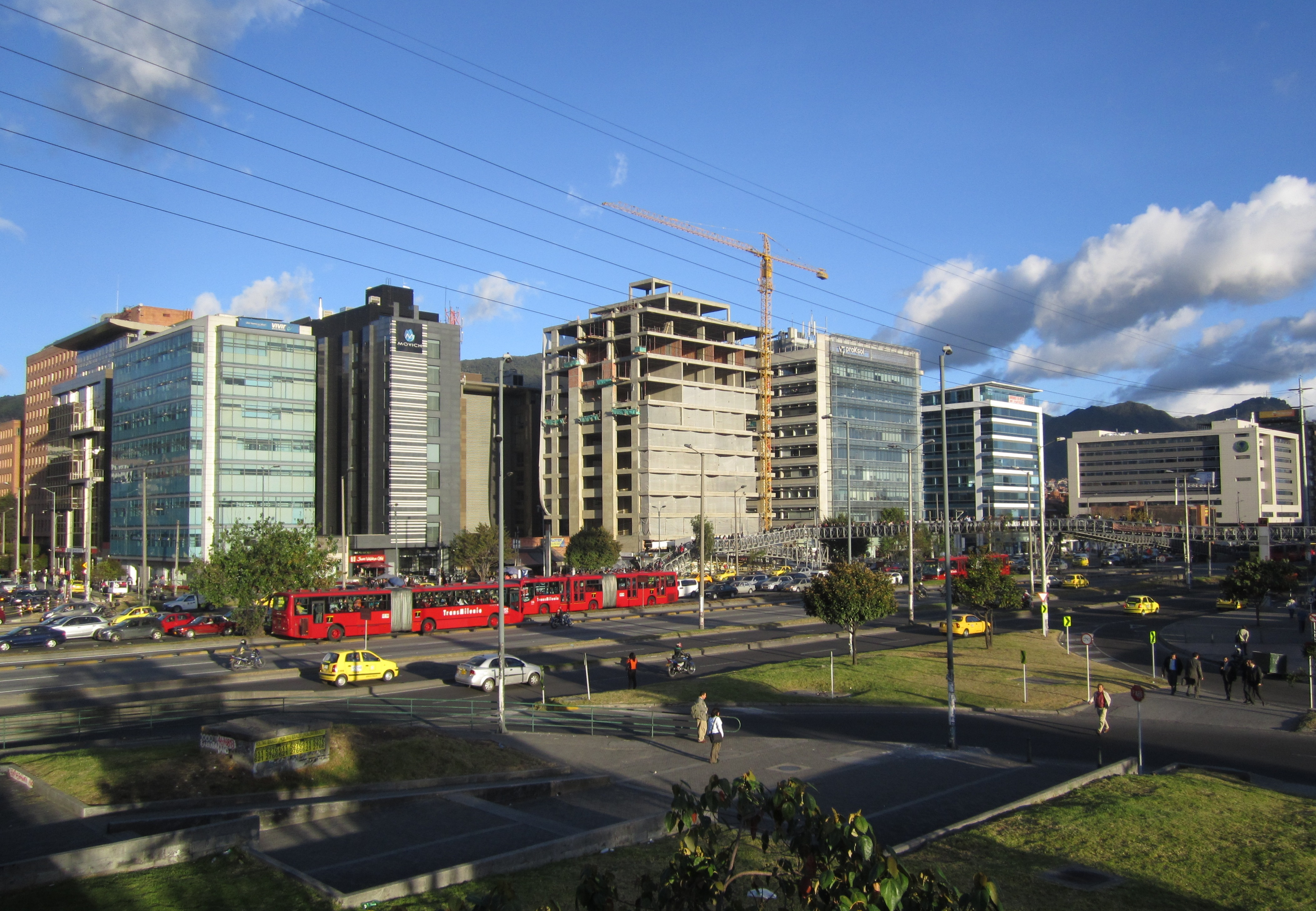
- Autopista Norte

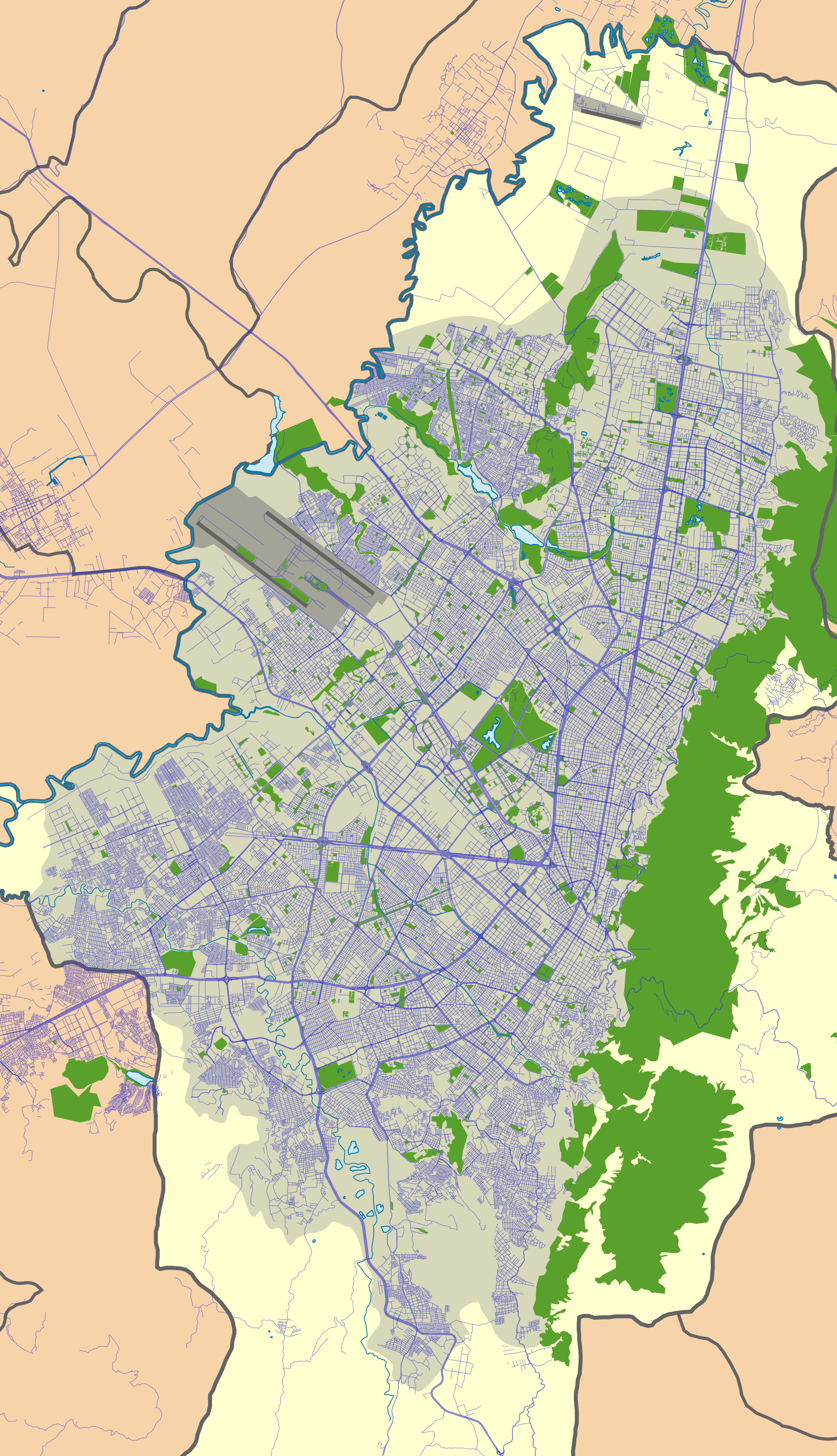
- Location within Bogotá
- Location: Bogotá; Colombia
- Coordinates: 4°45′43″N 74°02′47″W
- South end: Avenida Calle 80, Avenida Caracas
- North end: Barrio La Caro, Vereda Fusca, Chía

Autopista Norte, also called Autopista paseo de los libertadores (Way of the Liberators Highway), is a major road in Bogotá, Colombia, running through the northern part of the city to its southern end at Avenida Caracas.

== Names ==
The road was opened in 1956 and was named Autopista Norte until Calle 100. From that point north, it was known as Autopista paseo de los libertadores until the city of Tunja. Some time later, the name Autopista Norte came to mean the stretch of the road from its southerly beginning until Calle 194.

Due to changes in nomenclature and the urban expansion of the city to the north, the name was changed to Avenida 13 and was changed again in 2006 to Avenida Carrera 45.

== Route ==
The road begins in the Los Héroes monument between the Barrios Unidos and Chapinero localities and continues north. In its median is a line of the TransMilenio mass-transit system to Portal del Norte on Calle 170. It continues north to La Caro in Chia.

Between 180th and 192nd streets the Autopista has been reconstructed. As of 2010, it has 5 lanes each way and 1 extra lane in the middle for a Transmilenio expansion towards the north.

== Points of interest ==
- Portal del Norte (TransMilenio)
- Santafé shopping center
- Bima shopping center with amusement parks multiparque
- Escuela Colombiana de Ingeniería (Colombian School of Engineering)
- Universidad Católica de Colombia (Catholic University of Colombia)
- Colegio Odontológico Colombiano (Colombia Dentistry College)
- Clínica Universitaria Teletón (Teletón University Clinic of La Sabana)
- The Jardines de Paz, Jardines del Recuerdo, and Jardines de la Inmaculada cemeteries
