= Ischnura chingaza =

Conservation status
- Least Concern (IUCN 3.1)

Scientific classification
- Kingdom: Animalia
- Phylum: Arthropoda
- Clade: Pancrustacea
- Class: Insecta
- Order: Odonata
- Suborder: Zygoptera
- Family: Coenagrionidae
- Genus: Ischnura
- Species: I. chingaza

Binomial name
- Ischnura chingaza Realpe, 2010

Species of damselfly

Ischnura chingaza is a species of damselfly in the genus Ischnura, of the family Coenagrionidae, endemic to the Eastern Ranges of the Colombian Andes. It was first described by Emilio Realpe in 2010.

== Etymology ==
Ischnura chingaza is named after the Chingaza National Natural Park, where the species has been found.

== Description ==
Ischnura chingaza is a yellow-green to green species of damselfly with a total length of 25.5 to 26 millimetres (1.00 to 1.02 in). The back part of the head is light yellow. The labia are white. The male samples described have black with light yellow compound eyes, while the eyes females are black with light blue.

A study published in 2012 describes the behaviour of the larvae in a pond located in Cogua, Cundinamarca at an altitude of 2,842 metres (9,324 ft) and an average temperature of 14 °C (57 °F). The eggs of Ischnura chingaza are oval in shape with a length of 0.89 millimetres (0.035 in) and a width of 0.18 millimetres (0.0071 in). The egg stage of the species ranged from two weeks to one month. The average larvae stage was 258.2 days, longer than of other species of Ischnura.

== Habitat ==
The species occurs in and near the grasslands and páramo biomes of Chingaza National Natural Park, Cundinamarca at altitudes between 2,600 metres (8,500 ft) and 3,200 metres (10,500 ft). The breeding area are freshwater ponds. The species is relatively tolerant to the presence of cattle. Ischnura chingaza also has been reported in the wetlands of Parque Metropolitano La Florida and La Conejera.

== See also ==
- List of flora and fauna named after the Muisca
- Chingaza National Natural Park, Thomas van der Hammen Natural Reserve, wetlands of Bogotá

== Bibliography ==
- Casallas Mancipe, A; Rache Rodríguez, L.; Rincón Hernández, M. (2012), "Postembrionary development of Ischnura chingaza Realpe under captivity conditions (Zygoptera Coenagrionidae)", Odonatologica, 41: 327–335
- Realpe, Emilio (2010), "Two new Andean species of the genus Ischnura Charpentier from Colombia, with a key to the regional species (Zygoptera: Coenagrionidae)", Odonatologica, 39: 121–131
