= Juan Amarillo =

Juan Amarillo may refer to:

- Juan Amarillo River, river on the Bogotá savanna
- Tibabuyes or Juan Amarillo Wetland, wetland on the Bogotá savanna
