= Polygonum punctatum =

Polygonum punctatum is species name that has been published seven times and is a botanical synonym of six accepted species of plant:

- Persicaria hydropiper, synonym published in 1912 by Augustin Abel Hector Léveillé
- Persicaria hydropiperoides, synonym published in 1856 by Carl Meissner
- Persicaria lapathifolia, synonym published in 1823 by Anton Johann Krocker
- Persicaria maculosa, var. maculosa synonym published in 1864 by Martin Baldwin Kittel
- Persicaria nepalensis, synonym published in 1825 by David Don
- Persicaria punctata, synonym published in 1817 by Stephen Elliott
- Peutalis punctata, synonym published in 1820 by Constantine Samuel Rafinesque
