= Salitre =

Salitre is Spanish for saltpeter and may refer to:

== Geography ==
- Salitre (Costa Rica), an indigenous territory of Costa Rica
- Salitre, Ceará, a municipality of Ceara, Brazil
- El Salitre, town in Hidalgo, Mexico
- El Salitre (wetland), a wetland in Bogotá, Colombia
- Salitre Canton, Guayas Province, Ecuador
- Salitre River, a river in Bahía State, Brazil
- Salitre River, Bogotá, river on the Bogotá savanna in Colombia

== Other uses ==
- One of the joint South America air forces maneuvers
- Teatro do Salitre, theatre in Lisbon, Portugal between 1782 and 1858

== See also ==
- Saltpeter (disambiguation)
