= Persicaria acris =

Persicaria acris has been published three times and is a botanical synonym of two species of plant:

- Persicaria hydropiper, synonym published in 1792 by Jean-Emmanuel Gilibert (1741-1814)
- Persicaria hydropiper, synonym published in 1822 by Samuel Frederick Gray (1766-1828)
- Persicaria punctata, synonym published in 1896 by Manuel Gómez de la Maza y Jiménez (1867-1916)
