= El Burro =

Wetland in Bogotá, Colombia

El Burro Wetland Humedal El Burro
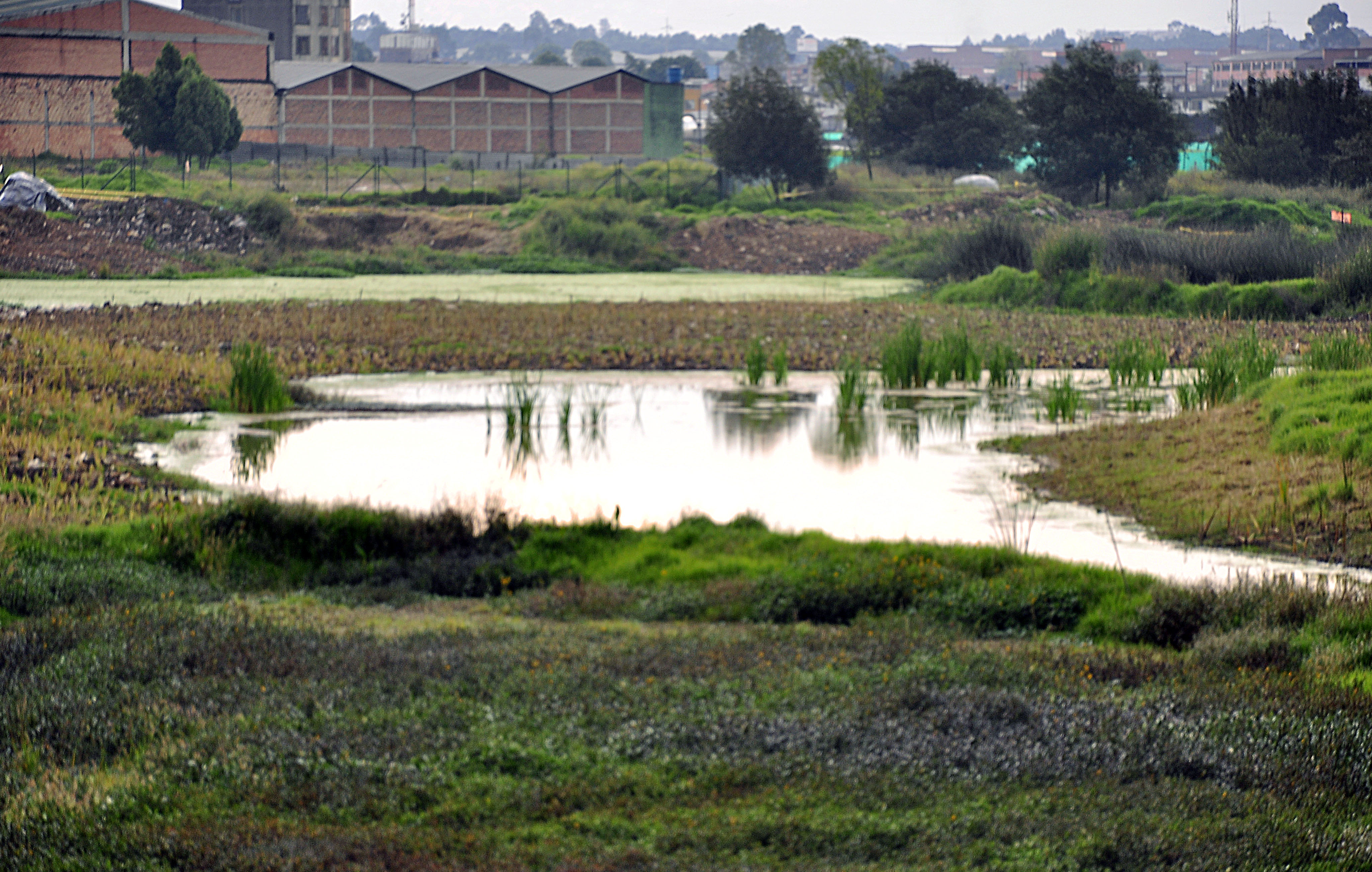
- El Burro Wetland

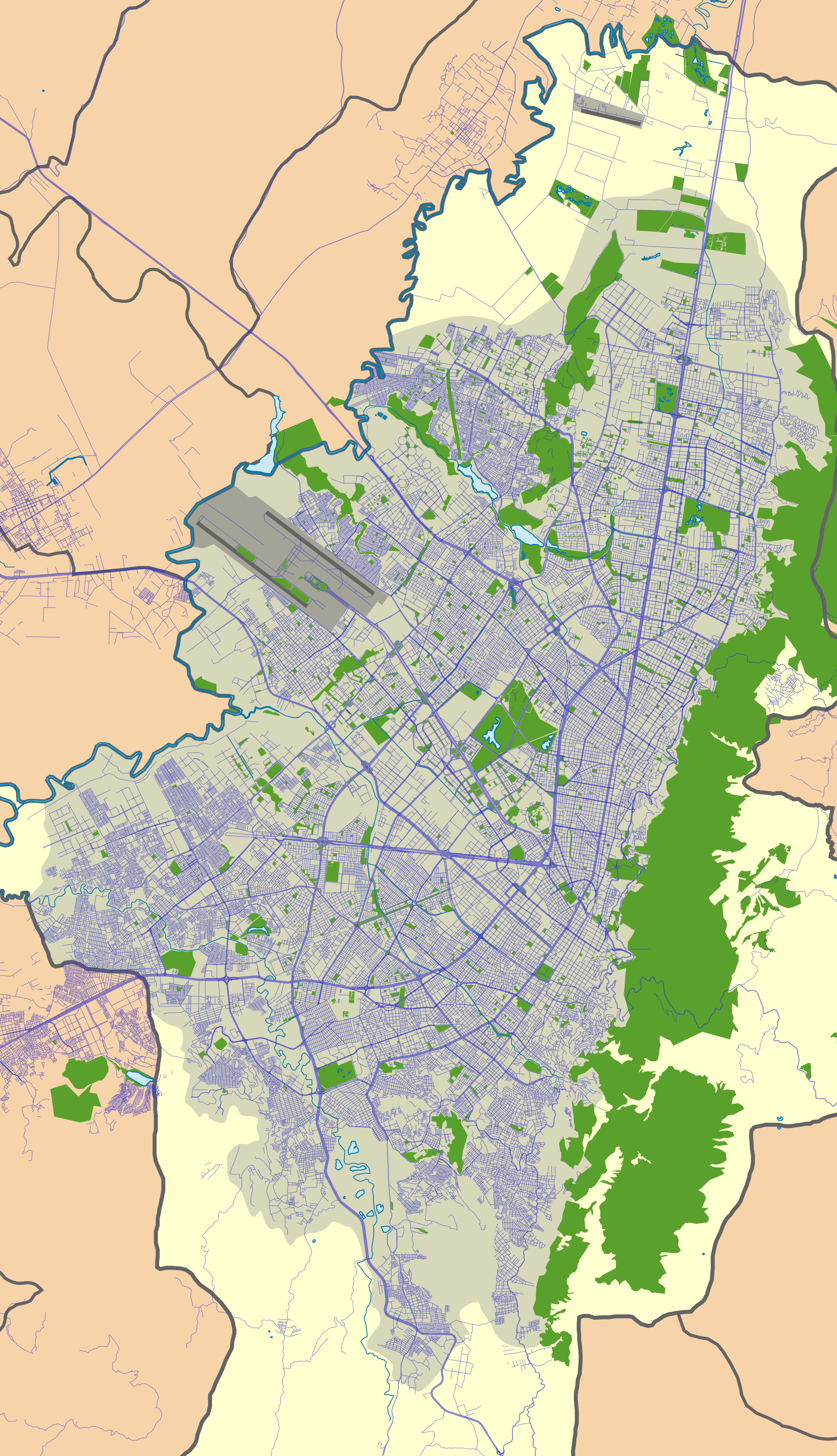
- Location within Bogotá
- Location: Kennedy, Bogotá; Colombia
- Coordinates: 4°38′30″N 74°9′00″W
- Area: 18.84 ha (46.6 acres)
- Elevation: 2,541 m (8,337 ft)
- Designated: September 2003
- Administrator: EAAB - ESP

El Burro (Spanish: Humedal El Burro) is a wetland, part of the Wetlands of Bogotá, in the locality Kennedy, Bogotá, Colombia. The wetland on the Bogotá savanna covers about 19 hectares (47 acres) and is crossed by the Avenida Ciudad de Cali.

== Flora and fauna ==
=== Flora ===
Flora registered in the wetland land include common duckweed (Lemna minor) and swamp smartweed (Polygonum hydropyperoides), among other plant species.

=== Birds ===
El Burro has 33 registered bird species, among others the common moorhen (Gallinula chloropus) and yellow-hooded blackbird (Agelaius icterocephalus).

== Panorama ==
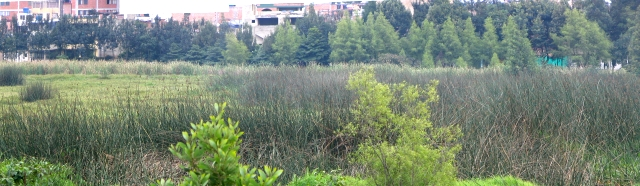
El Burro Wetland

== See also ==
- Biodiversity of Colombia, Bogotá savanna, Thomas van der Hammen Natural Reserve
- Wetlands of Bogotá
