= Wetlands of Bogotá =

Wetlands in Bogotá, Colombia

Designations

Ramsar Wetland
- Official name: Complejo de Humedales Urbanos del Distrito Capital de Bogotá
- Designated: 6 August 2018
- Reference no.: 2404

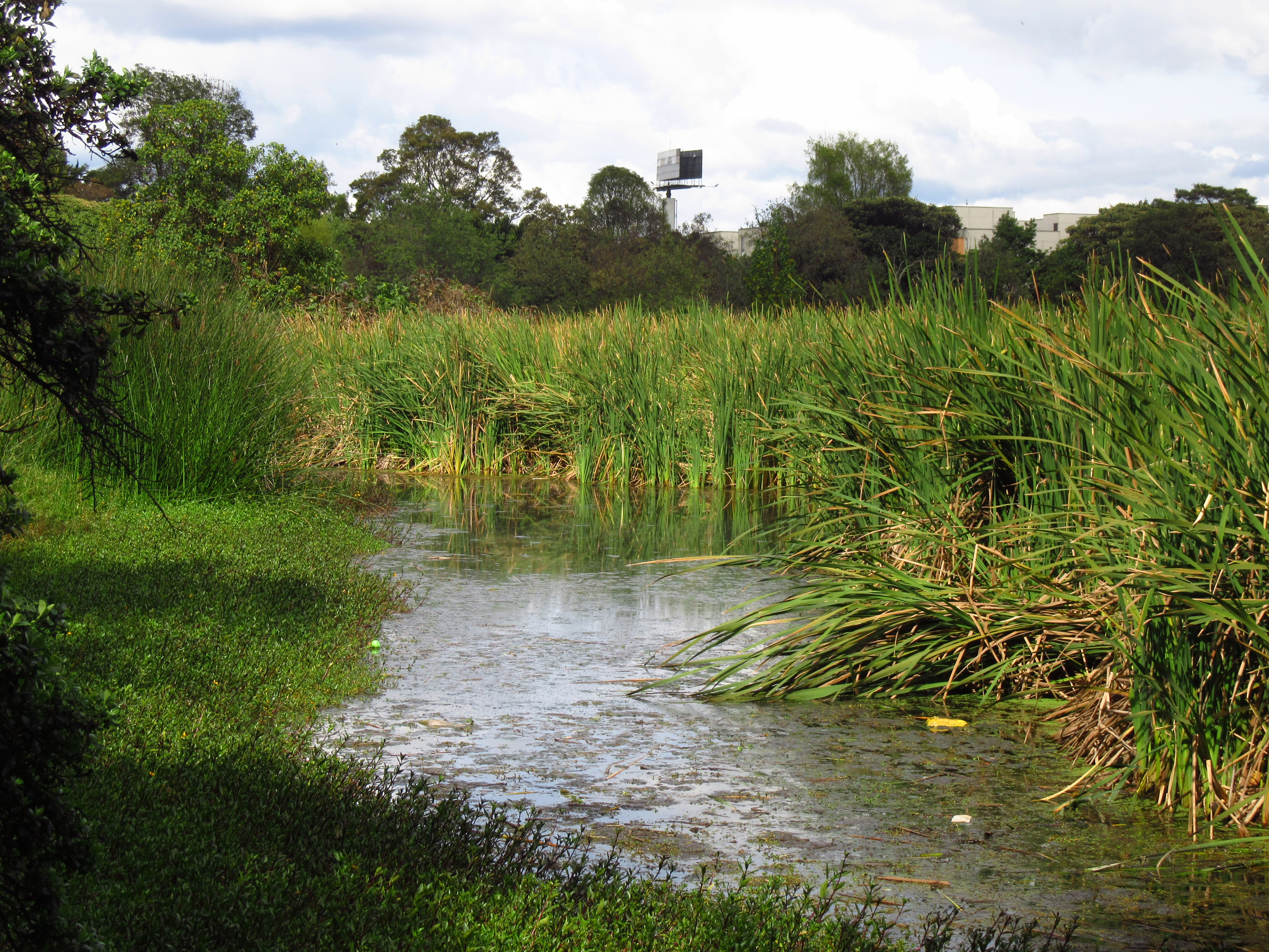
Santa María del Lago

Wetlands of Bogotá, Colombia, are important areas of the capital city, and their preservation has become increasingly important for the area north of the Andes. As a reserve for fauna and flora, the wetlands are vital for the preservation and reproduction of a wide variety of mammals, reptiles, and birds. These include more than 95 species of migratory birds, as well as many endemic plant species. The wetlands are part of the Bogotá River basin. The wetland complex has been designated as a protected Ramsar site since 2018.

Three types of wetland ecosystems have been identified in the district, differentiated by origin and location: plain wetlands are located in urban areas, while hillside and wasteland wetlands are found in the capital's rural areas. Many of the wetland ecosystems are disappearing due to rapid population growth within the city of Bogotá. Over time, and with the steady growth of the city, it is estimated that of the 150,000 hectares (370,000 acres) of wetlands that covered Bogotá in 1940, only 1,500 hectares (3,700 acres) remain today.

The flightless Colombian grebe, extinct in the 1980s, was restricted to the Wetlands.

== Bogotá Water Company ==
The development plan "For the Bogotá We Want" and the Land Use Plan, Plan de Ordenamiento Territorial known by the acronym POT, has designated Empresa de Acueducto de Bogotá (EAB; Bogota Water Company) as the entity in charge of rescuing and restoring Bogota's wetland ecosystems, which are found in a wide state of deterioration.

== Wetlands ==
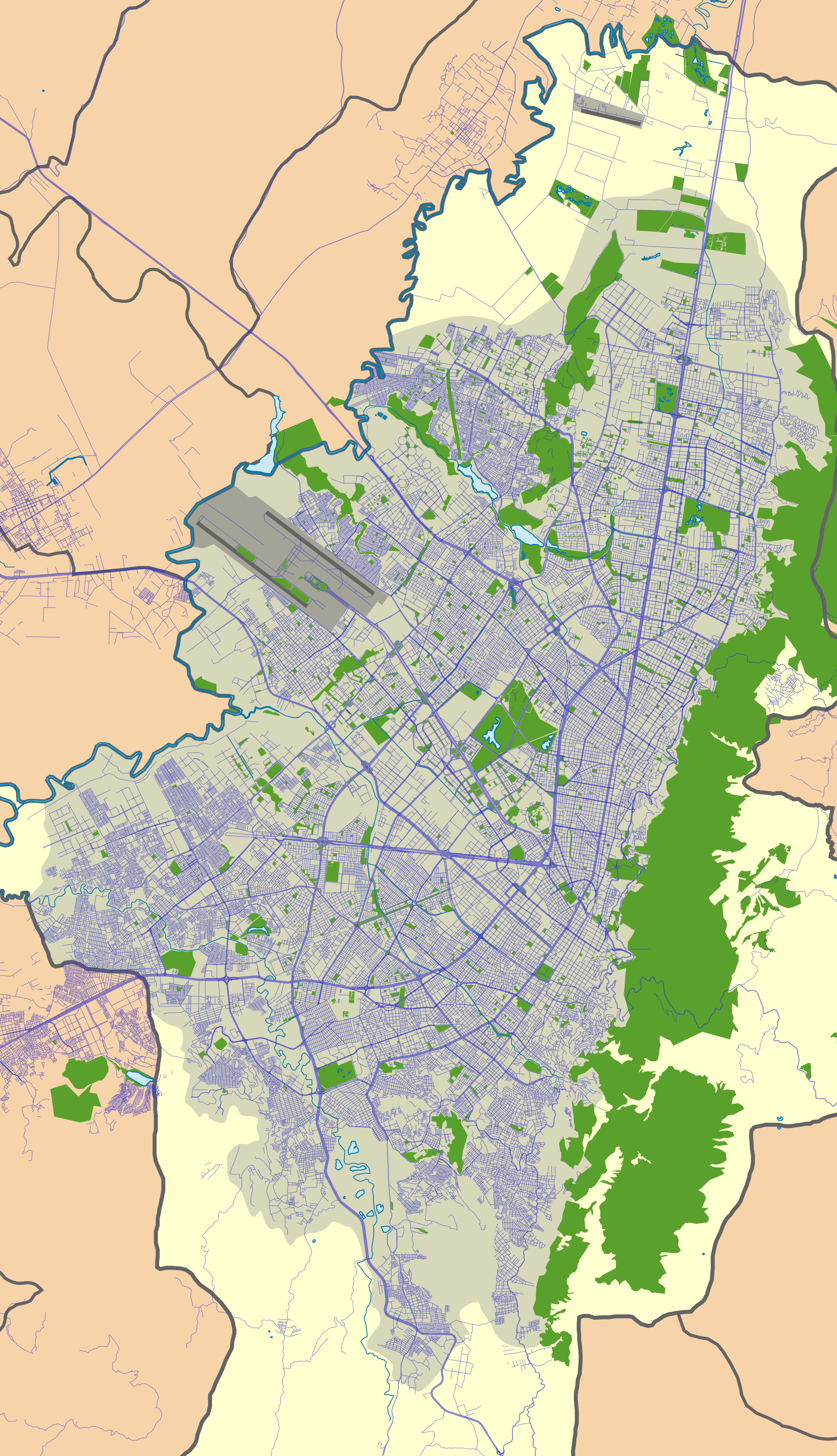
Wetlands within Bogotá
Torca River basin
Juan Amarillo River basin
Fucha River basin
Tunjuelo River basin

Wetland	Location	Altitude (m)	Area (ha)	Notes	Image
Guaymaral y Torca	Usaquén; Suba	2547	73		
La Conejera	Suba	2544	58.9		
Córdoba	Suba	2548	40.51		
Tibabuyes; Juan Amarillo	Suba; Engativá	2539	222.58		
Jaboque	Engativá	2539	148		
Santa María del Lago	Engativá	2549	12		
El Burro	Kennedy	2541	18.84		
La Vaca	Kennedy	2548	7.96		
Techo	Techo, Kennedy	2545	11.46		
Capellanía	Fontibón	2542	27.05		
Meandro del Say	Fontibón; Mosquera	2548	13.6		
Tibanica	Bosa; Soacha	2542	28.8		
El Salitre	Barrios Unidos	2558	6.4		
La Isla	Bosa	2550	7.7		
La Florida	Funza	2542	26		

== See also ==
- Biodiversity of Colombia
- List of flora and fauna named after the Muisca
- List of flora and fauna of the Eastern Hills, Bogotá
