= Capellanía (wetland) =

Wetland in Bogotá, Colombia

Capellanía Wetland Humedal de Capellanía
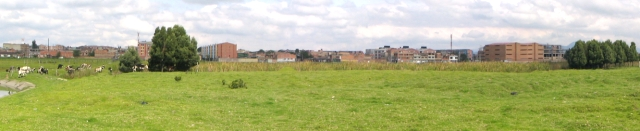
- Capellanía Wetland

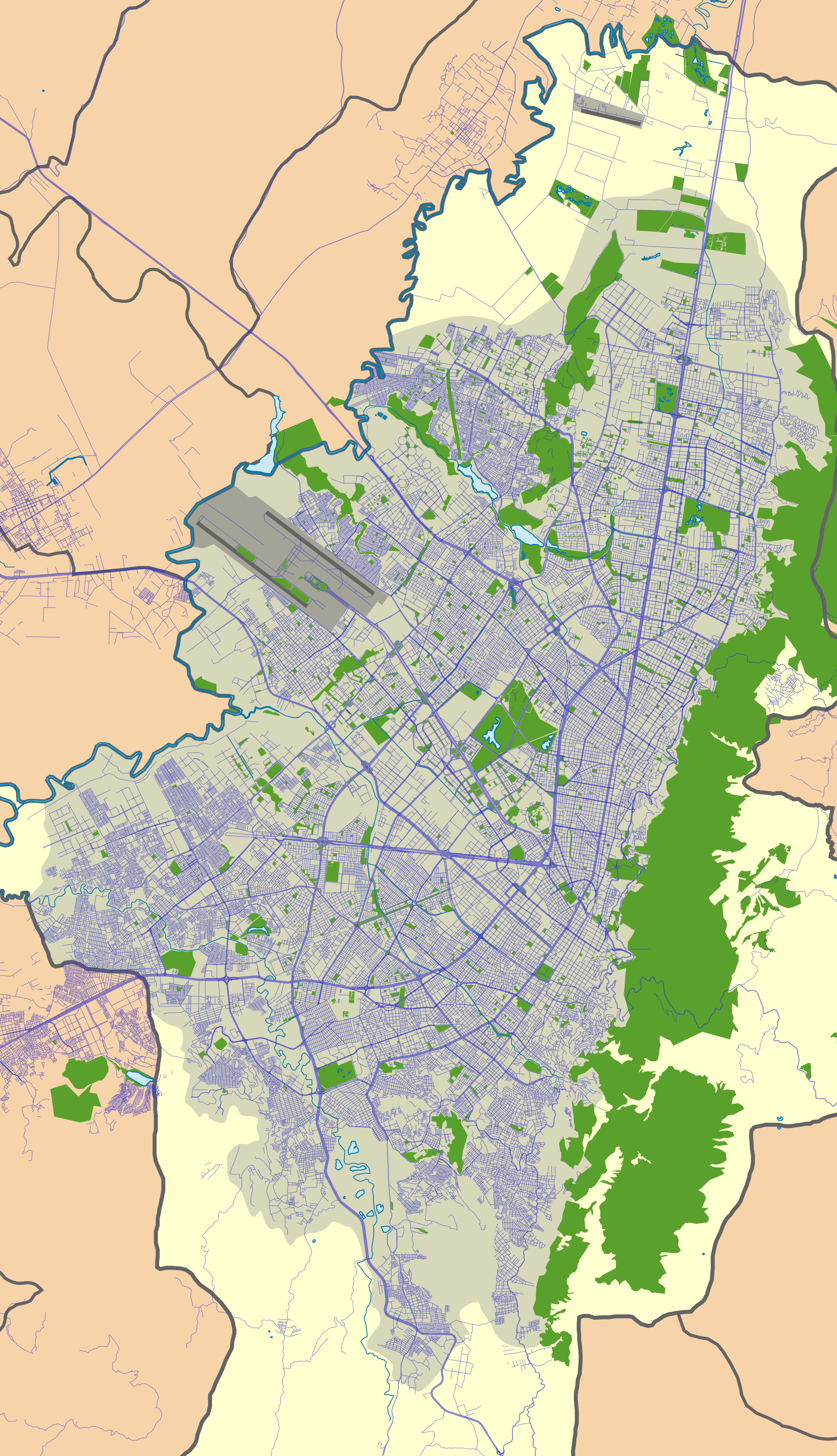
- Location within Bogotá
- Location: Fontibón, Bogotá; Colombia
- Coordinates: 4°40′30″N 74°7′50″W
- Area: 27.03 ha (66.8 acres)
- Elevation: 2,542 m (8,340 ft)
- Administrator: EAAB - ESP

Capellanía (Spanish: Humedal de Capellanía) is a wetland situated in the locality of Fontibón as one of the Wetlands of Bogotá, Colombia. It forms part of the Fucha River basin on the Bogotá savanna. Since 1995, it has been split into two due to the construction of the Avenida La Esperanza. This has caused rapid deterioration and the wetland is likely to disappear because of the industries that surround it, the current transportation projects of the area, and future developments approved by the district. The wetland covers 27 hectares (67 acres).

== Flora and fauna ==
Due to the industrial activities around the wetland, it hardly hosts fauna.

=== Flora ===
Flora registered in the wetland are among others kikuyu grass (Pennisetum clandestinum), southern bulrush (Scirpus californicus) and larger bur-marigold (Bidens laevis).

== See also ==
- Biodiversity of Colombia, Bogotá savanna, Thomas van der Hammen Natural Reserve
- Wetlands of Bogotá
