= La Florida (wetland) =

La Florida Humedal La Florida
- Parque Metropolitano La Florida
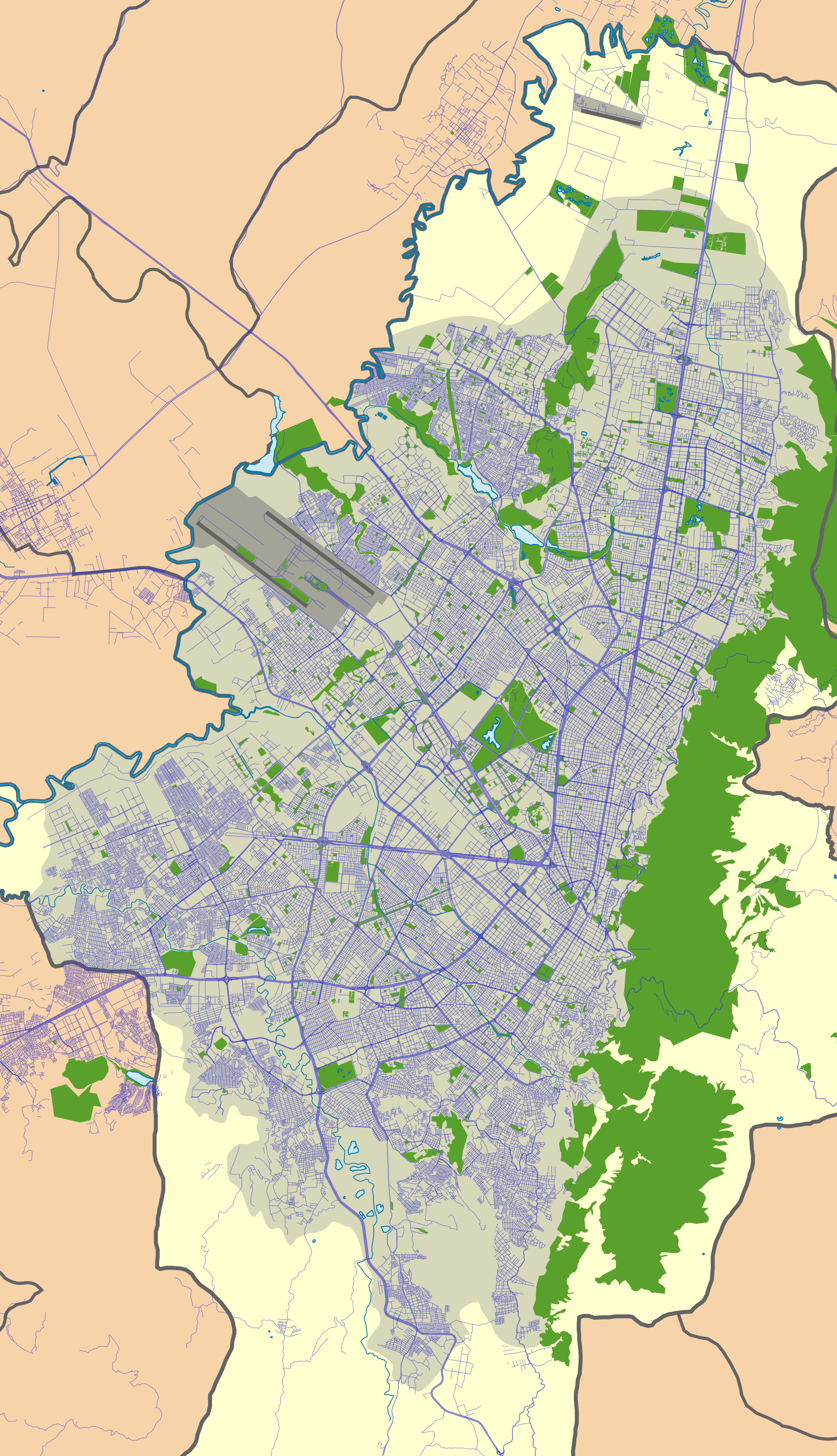
- Location within Bogotá
- Location: Funza, Cundinamarca; Colombia
- Coordinates: 4°43′45.8″N 74°09′01.7″W
- Area: 26 ha (64 acres)
- Elevation: 2,542 m (8,340 ft)
- Administrator: EAAB - ESP

La Florida is a wetland and park known as the Parque Metropolitano La Florida. La Florida is located across the Bogotá River from Jaboque wetland in the municipality Funza, Cundinamarca, close to Cota. La Florida does not belong to the protected wetlands of Bogotá.

== Flora and fauna ==
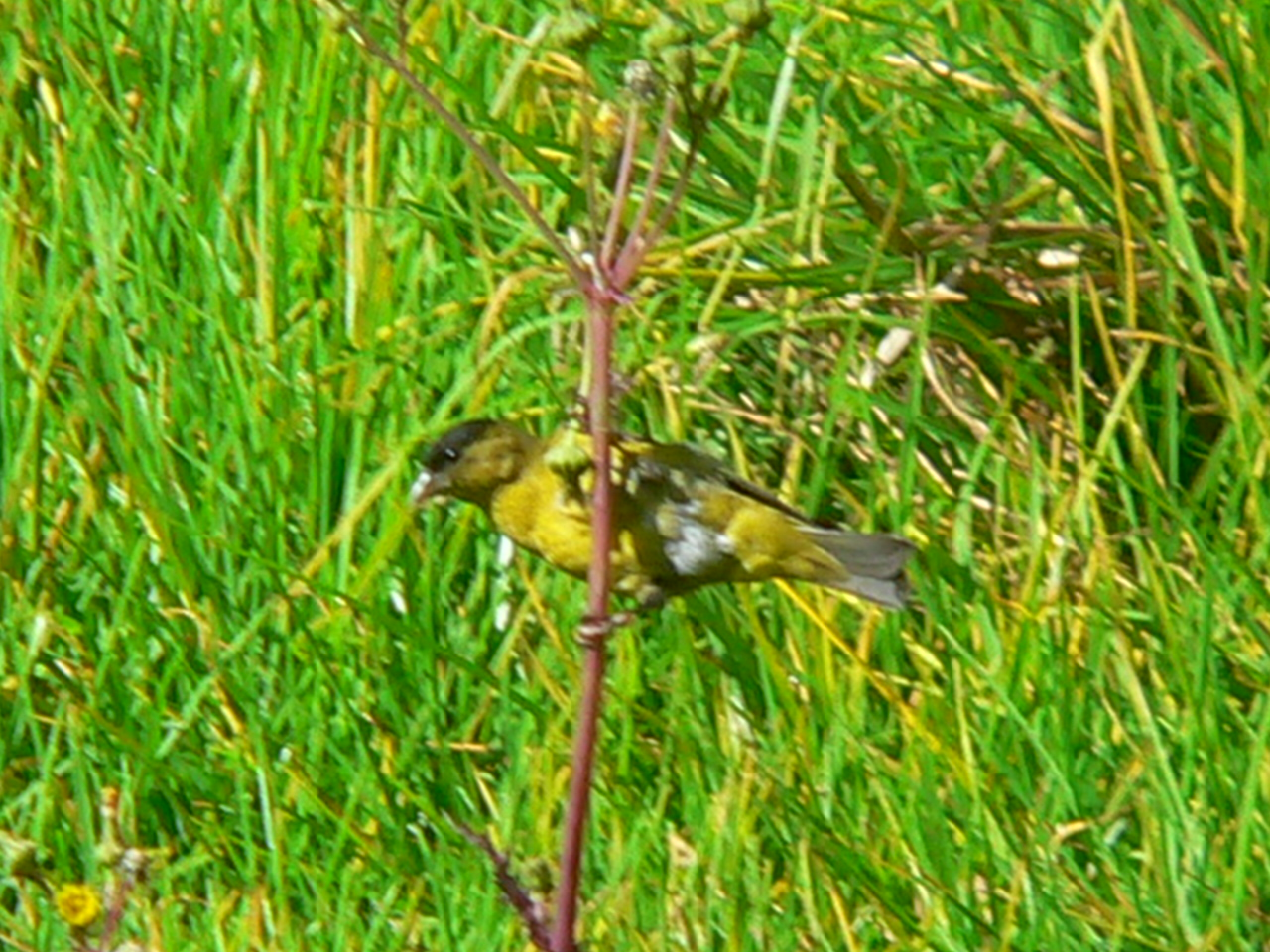
Andean siskin (Spinus spinescens) in La Florida

=== Birds ===
In La Florida, 90 species of birds have been registered, of which 13 endemic, uniquely in this wetland:

Name	Species	Image
green heron	Butorides virescens	
paramo seedeater	Catamenia homochroa	
ringed kingfisher	Megaceryle torquata	
fulvous whistling duck	Dendrocygna bicolor	
swallow-tailed kite	Elanoides forficatus	
little blue heron	Florida caerulea	
common snipe	Gallinago gallinago	
laughing gull	Larus atricilla	
brown-chested martin	Phaeoprogne tapera frusca	
Neotropic cormorant	Phalacrocorax olivaceus	
yellow-faced grassquit	Tiaris olivacea	
rufescent tiger heron	Tigrisoma lineatum	
silvery-throated spinetail	Synallaxis subpudica	

=== Insects ===
The dragonfly species Ischnura cruzi has been registered in La Florida, as well as in La Conejera and Santa María del Lago.

== See also ==
- Biodiversity of Colombia, Bogotá savanna, Thomas van der Hammen Natural Reserve
- Wetlands of Bogotá
