= La Vaca =

La Vaca Wetland Humedal La Vaca
- Techovita
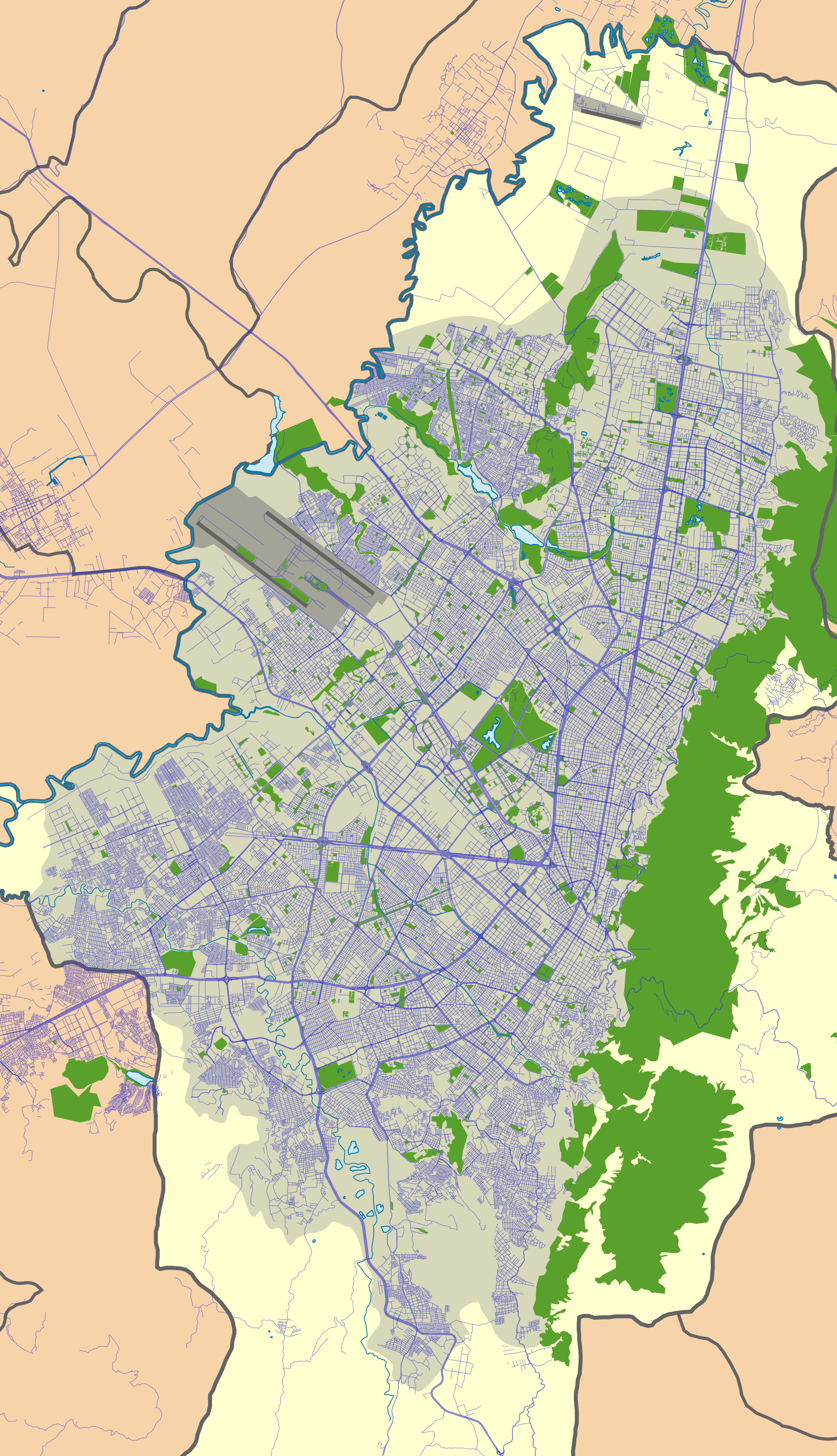
- Location within Bogotá
- Location: Kennedy, Bogotá; Colombia
- Coordinates: 4°37′38.23″N 74°09′37.12″W
- Area: 7.96 ha (19.7 acres)
- Elevation: 2,548 m (8,360 ft)
- Designated: September 2003
- Named for: Muysccubun: cacique Techovita
- Administrator: EAAB - ESP

La Vaca (Spanish: Humedal La Vaca) or Techovita is a small wetland, part of the Wetlands of Bogotá, located in the locality Kennedy, Bogotá, Colombia. The wetland, in the Tunjuelo River basin on the Bogotá savanna covers an area of about 8 hectares (20 acres). La Vaca is close to the Avenidad Ciudad de Cali.

== Etymology ==
The alternative name Techovita was the name of a cacique in the Muisca Confederation, the former country on the Altiplano Cundiboyacense before the Spanish conquest.

== See also ==
- Biodiversity of Colombia, Bogotá savanna, Thomas van der Hammen Natural Reserve
- Wetlands of Bogotá
