= Arzobispo River =

Juan Amarillo River Salitre River Arzobispo River
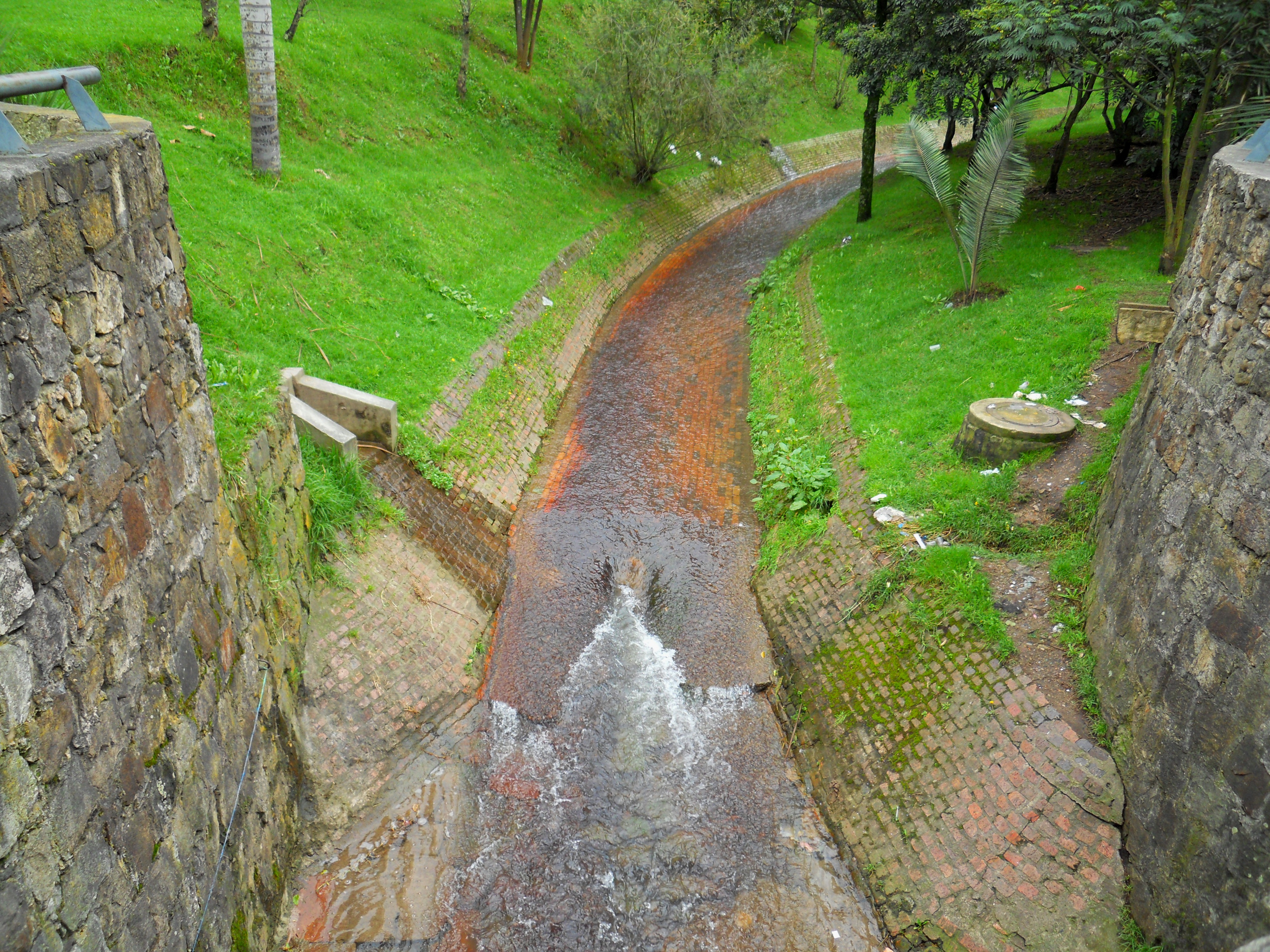

- Location of the Juan Amarillo River in Colombia
- Native name: Río Juan Amarillo (Spanish)

Location
- Country: Colombia
- Department: Cundinamarca
- Municipalities: Bogotá
- Localities: Usaquén, Chapinero, Santa Fe, Suba, Barrios Unidos, Teusaquillo, Engativá

Physical characteristics
- Source: Eastern Hills
  - coordinates: 4°38′09.1″N 74°02′00.2″W
  - elevation: 3,300 m (10,800 ft)
- Mouth: Bogotá River
  - location: Tibabuyes
  - coordinates: 4°44′15.2″N 74°07′38.7″W
  - elevation: 2,539 m (8,330 ft)
- Basin size: 12,892 ha (31,860 acres)

Basin features
- River system: Bogotá River; Magdalena Basin; Caribbean Sea

The Juan Amarillo, Arzobispo, or Salitre River is a river on the Bogotá savanna and a left tributary of the Bogotá River in Colombia. The river originates from various quebradas in the Eastern Hills and flows into the Bogotá River at the largest of the wetlands of Bogotá, Tibabuyes, also called Juan Amarillo Wetland. The total surface area of the Juan Amarillo basin, covering the localities Usaquén, Chapinero, Santa Fe, Suba, Barrios Unidos, Teusaquillo, and Engativá, is 12,892 hectares (31,860 acres). Together with the Fucha and Tunjuelo Rivers, the Juan Amarillo River forms part of the left tributaries of the Bogotá River in the Colombian capital.

== Description ==
Source and mouth of the Juan Amarillo River on the Bogotá savanna

The Juan Amarillo, Arzobispo, or Salitre River, is formed by various quebradas ("creeks") sourced at an altitude of 3,300 metres (10,800 ft) in the Eastern Hills of Bogotá. Main feeder creeks are Las Delicias, La Vieja, El Chicó, Los Molinos, Santa Bárbara, Delicias del Carmen, El Cóndor, El Cedro, San Cristóbal, La Cita and La Floresta. The Juan Amarillo Basin covers the localities Usaquén, Chapinero and Santa Fe in its upper course and Suba, Barrios Unidos, Teusaquillo and Engativá in its lower drainage area. The Suba Hills (cerros de Suba) are located in the Juan Amarillo River basin. The total surface area of the Juan Amarillo basin is 12,892 hectares (31,860 acres).

The river transports 3,400 milligrams per litre (0.00012 lb/cu in) of solid sediments, of which 1,320 milligrams per litre (4.8×10^{−5} lb/cu in) reach the mouth of the river near the Tibabuyes wetland.

== Wetlands ==
Six of the fifteen protected wetlands of Bogotá are located in the Juan Amarillo River basin.

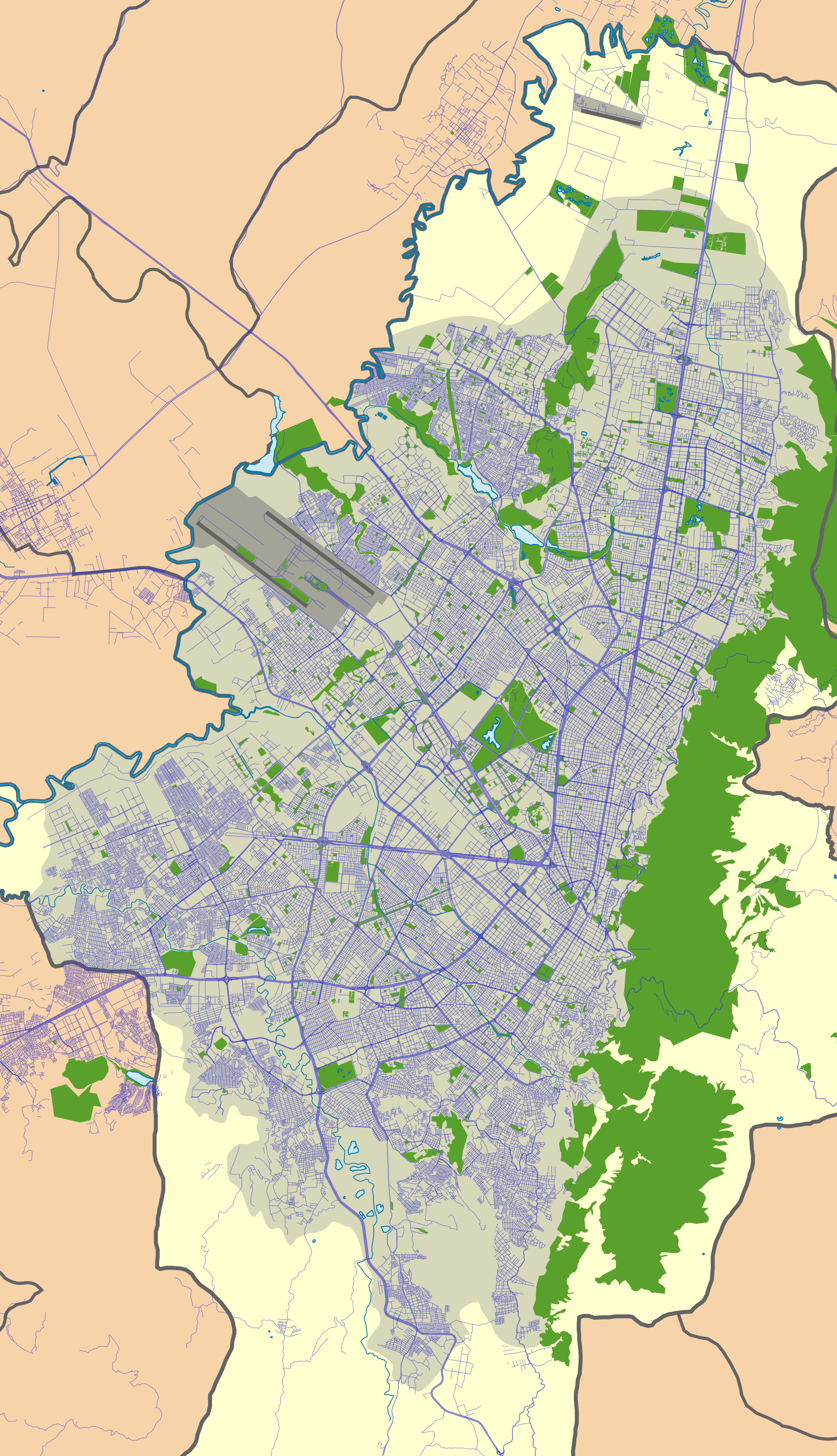
Wetlands within the Juan Amarillo Basin

| Wetland | Location | Altitude (m) | Area (ha) | Notes | Image |
|---|---|---|---|---|---|
| La Conejera | Suba | 2544 | 58.9 | | |
| Tibabuyes; Juan Amarillo | Suba; Engativá | 2539 | 222.58 | | |
| Jaboque | Engativá | 2539 | 148 | | |
| Córdoba | Suba | 2548 | 40.51 | | |
| Santa María del Lago | Engativá | 2549 | 12 | | |
| El Salitre | Barrios; Unidos | 2558 | 6.4 | | |

== Gallery ==
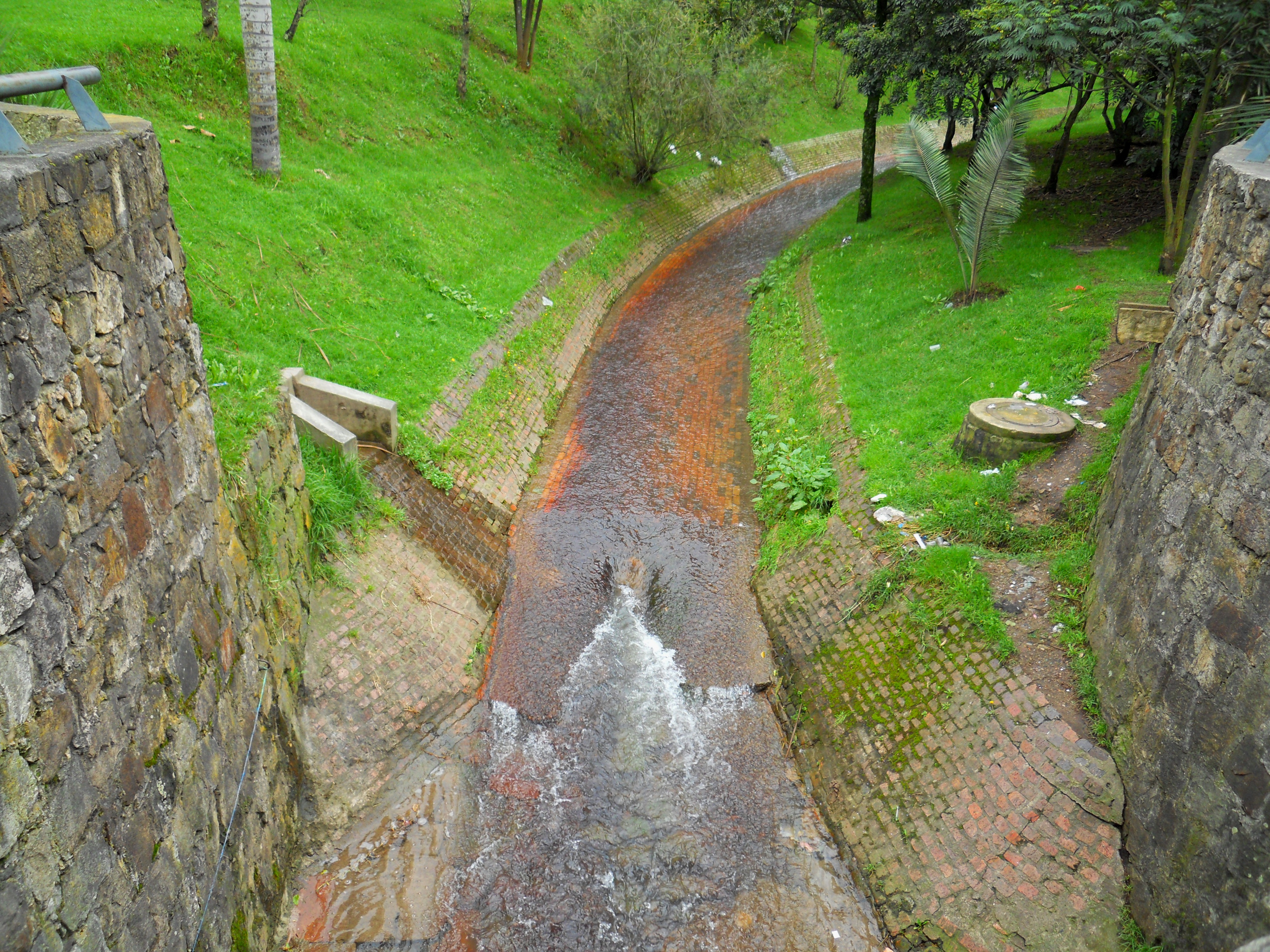
Channelised part near the Carrera Séptima

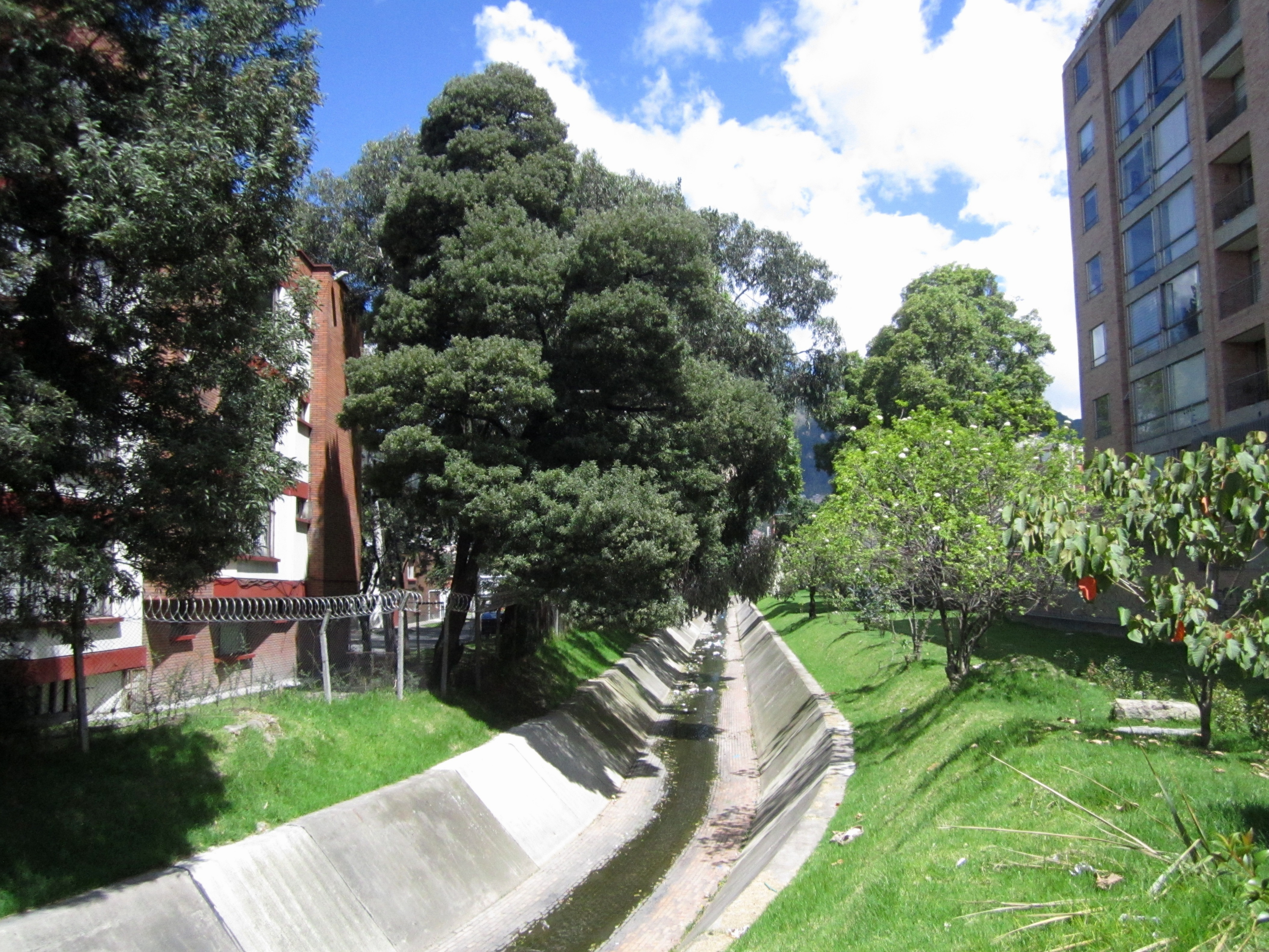
Channel near Carrera 30

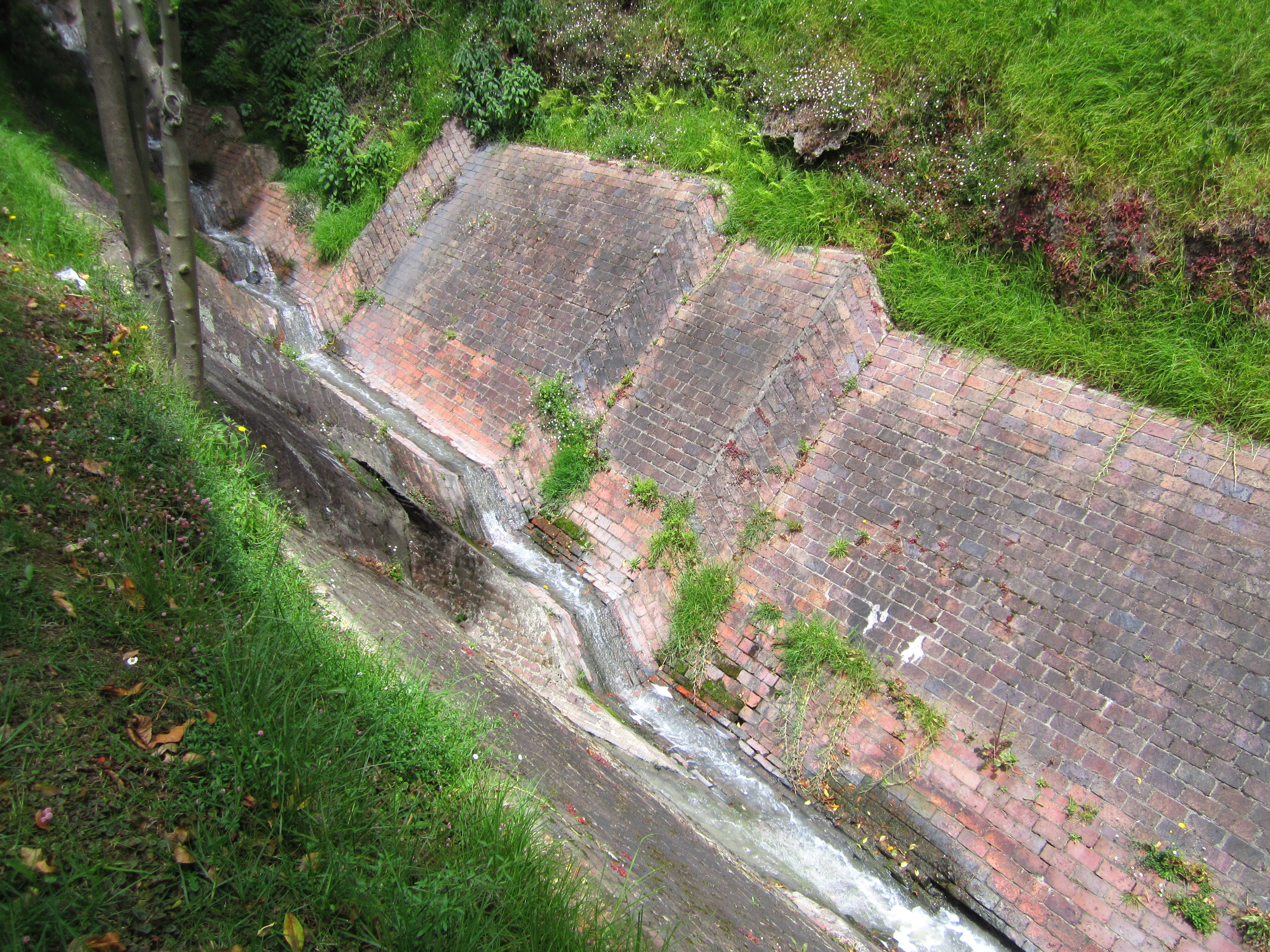
Quebrada El Virrey

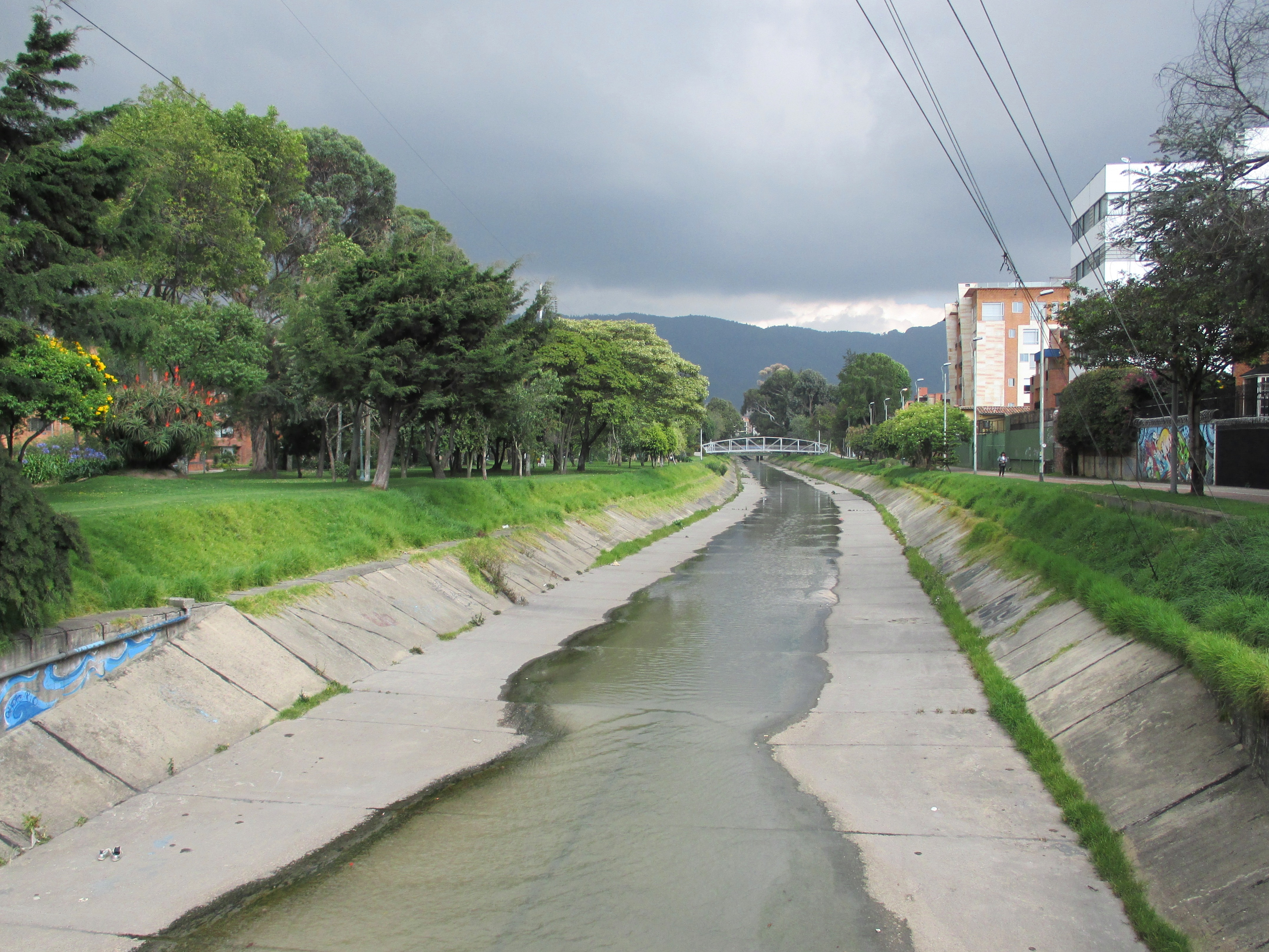
Channelised Río Molinos, near Carrera 25

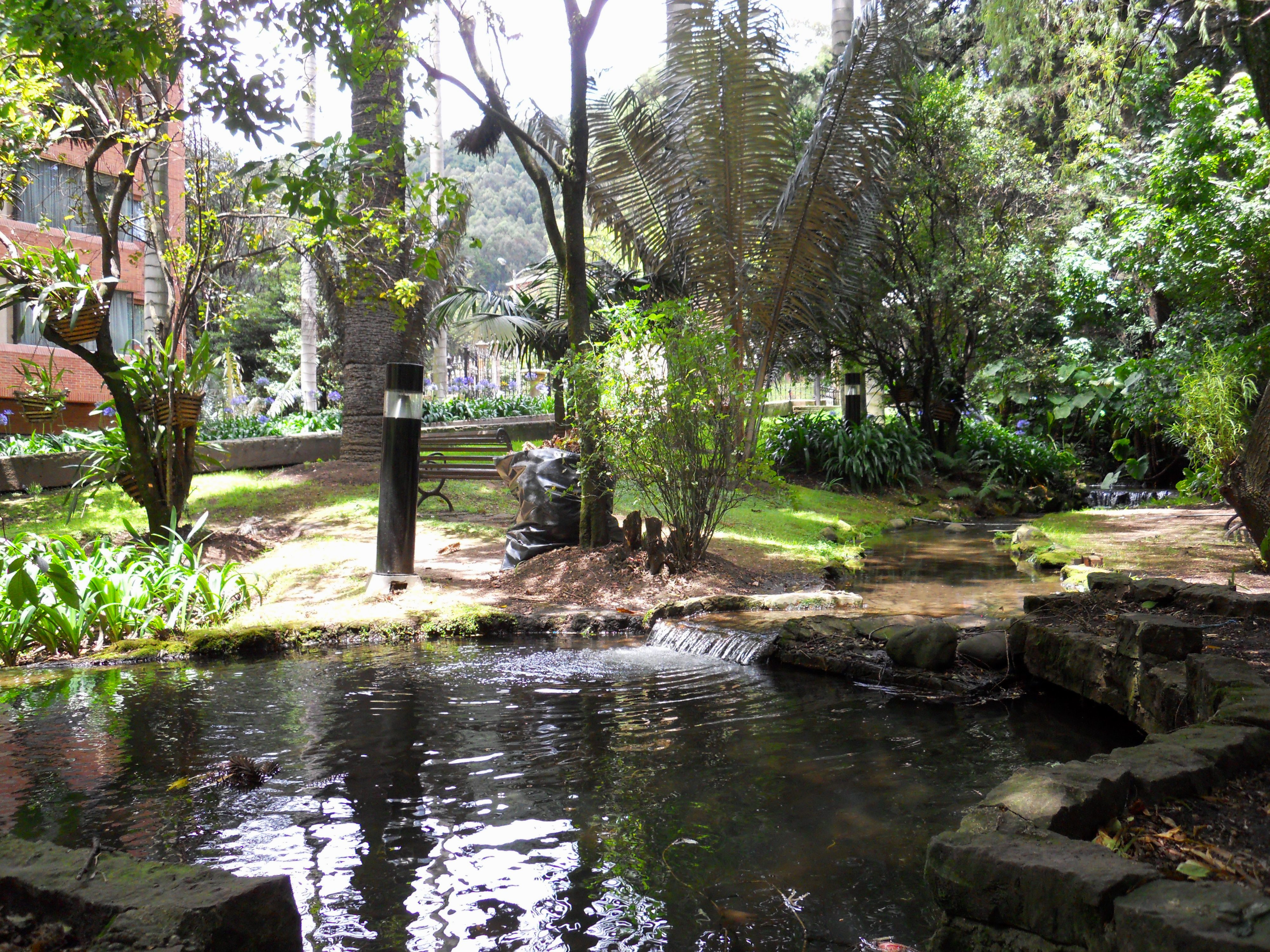
Quebrada El Chicó

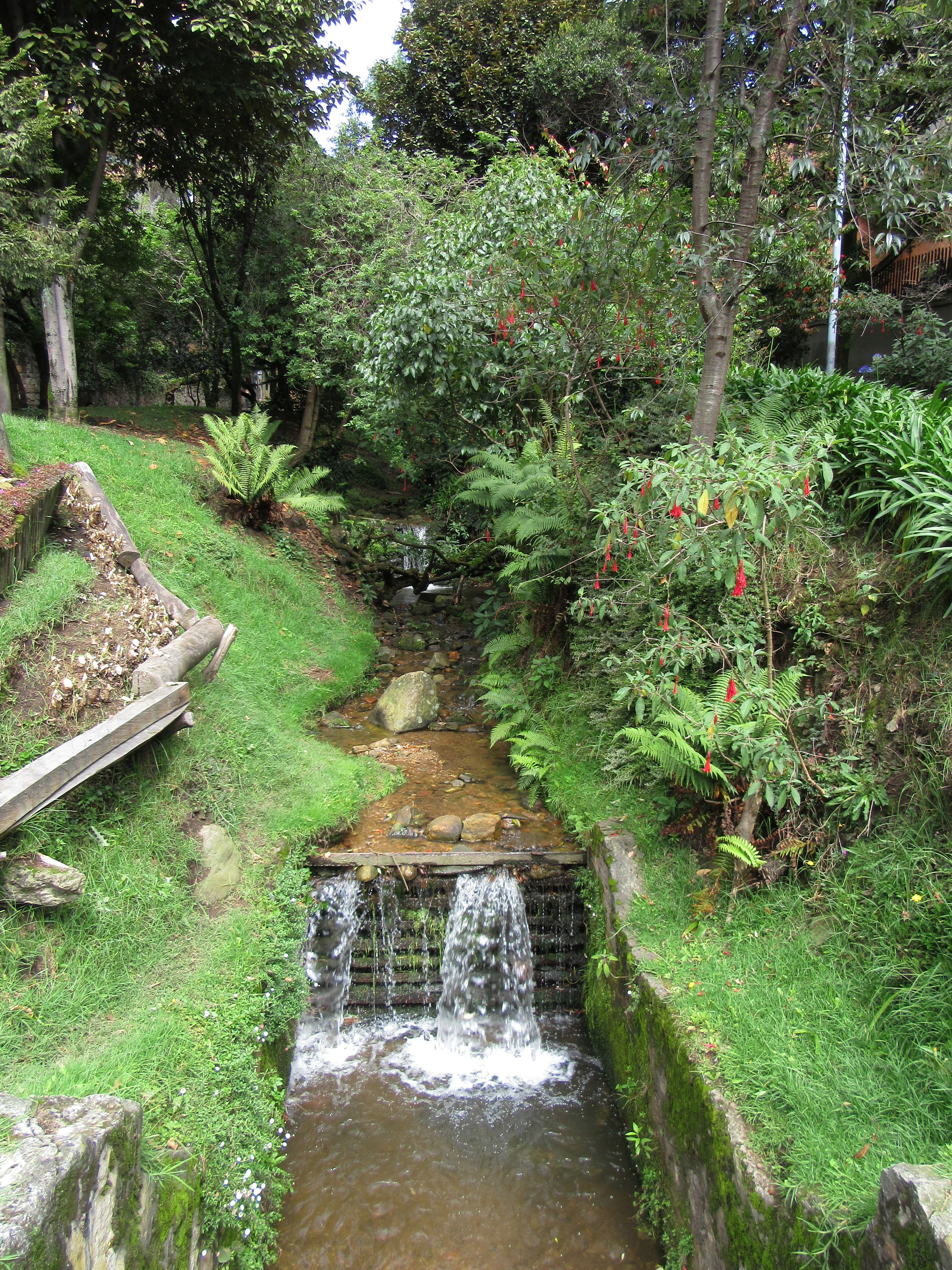
Quebrada La Vieja

== See also ==
- List of rivers of Colombia
- Eastern Hills, Bogotá
- Bogotá savanna
- Fucha River, Tunjuelo River
