= Santa María del Lago =

Santa María del Lago Wetland Humedal Santa María del Lago
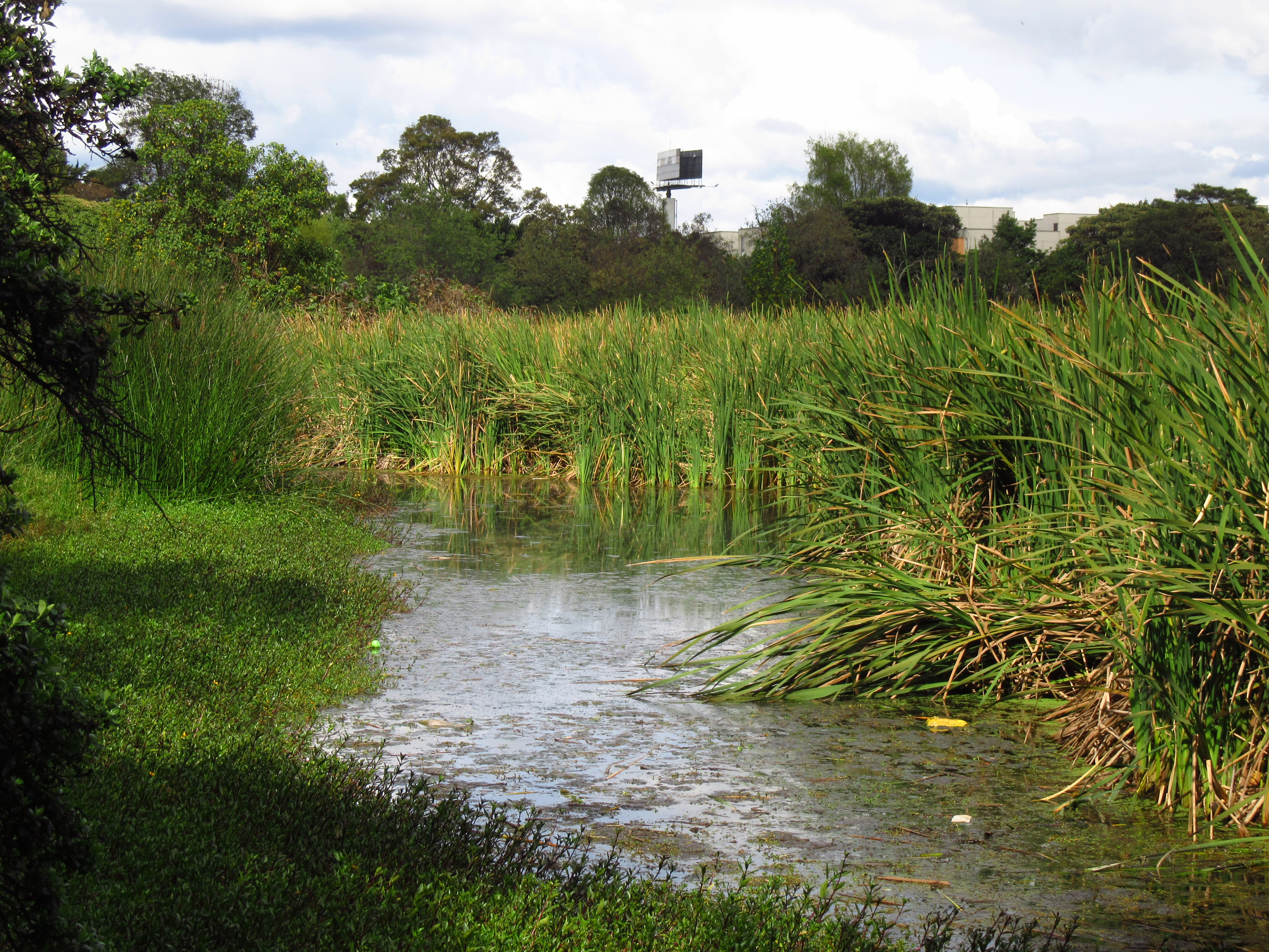
- Santa María del Lago Wetland

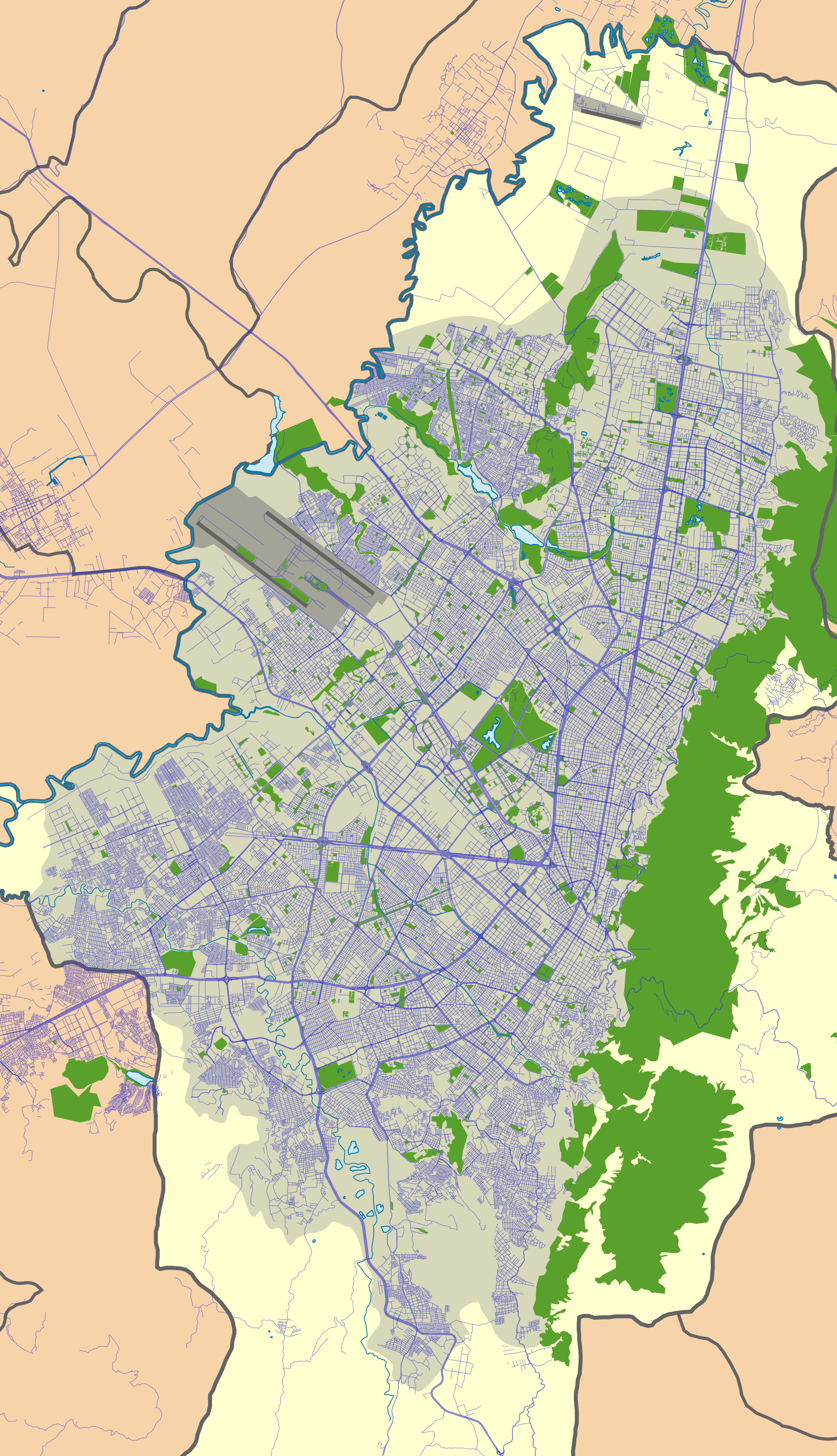
- Location within Bogotá
- Location: Engativá, Bogotá; Colombia
- Coordinates: 4°41′41.0″N 74°05′39.0″W
- Area: 12 ha (30 acres)
- Elevation: 2,549 m (8,363 ft)
- Designated: September 2003
- Administrator: EAAB - ESP

Santa María del Lago (Spanish: Humedal Santa María del Lago) is a wetland, part of the Wetlands of Bogotá, located in the locality Engativá, Bogotá, Colombia. The wetland on the Bogotá savanna covers an area of 12 hectares (30 acres), of which 4 hectares (9.9 acres) water.

== Flora and fauna ==
=== Insects ===
The dragonfly species Ischnura cruzi has been registered in Santa María del Lago, as well as in La Conejera and La Florida.

=== Birds ===
Santa María del Lago hosts 43 bird species.

== See also ==
- Biodiversity of Colombia, Bogotá savanna, Thomas van der Hammen Natural Reserve
- Wetlands of Bogotá
