= La Conejera =

La Conejera Wetland Humedal La Conejera
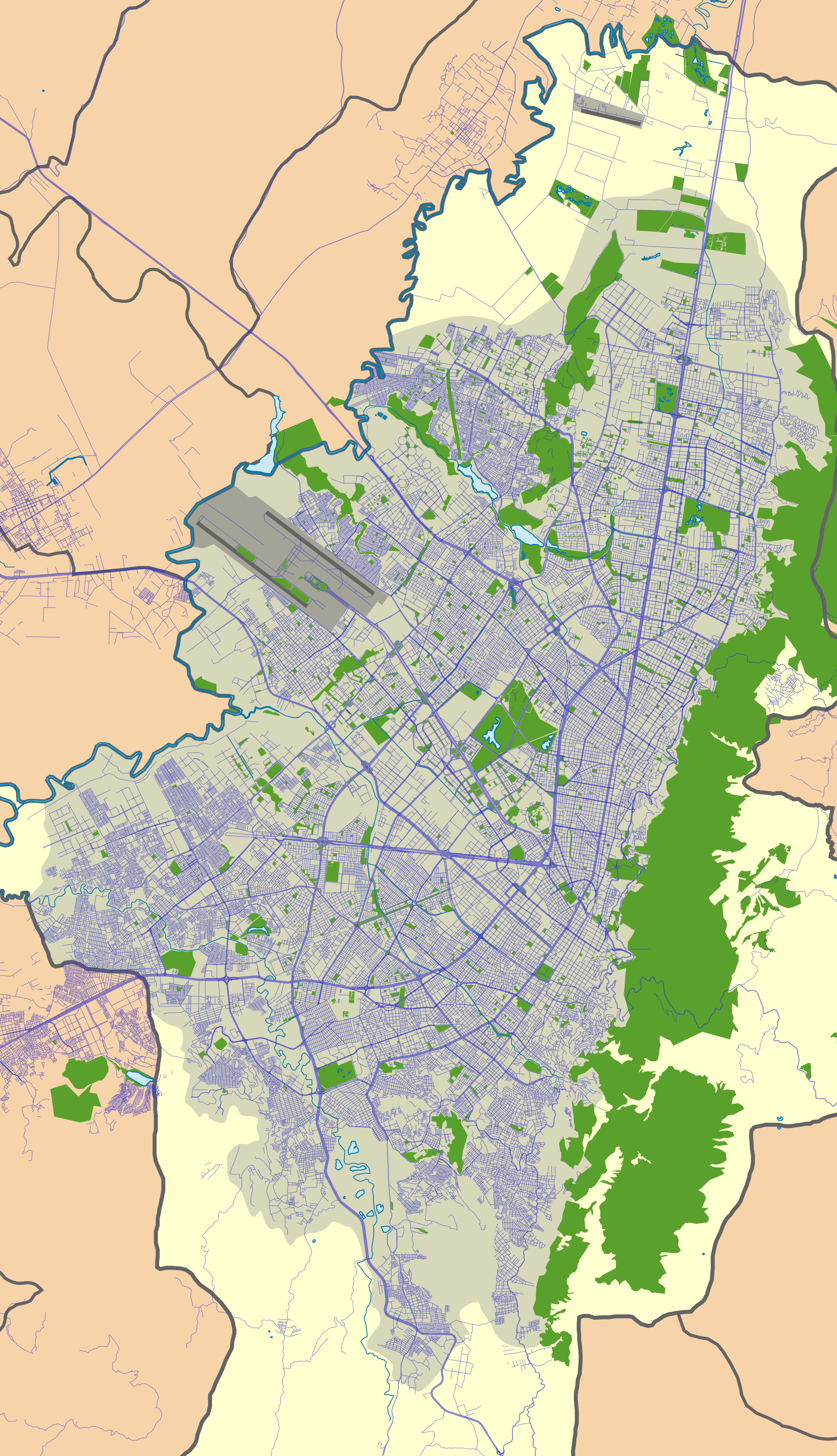
- Location within Bogotá
- Location: Suba, Bogotá; Colombia
- Coordinates: 4°45′42.1″N 74°06′09.2″W
- Area: 58.9 ha (146 acres)
- Elevation: 2,544 m (8,346 ft)
- Designated: September 2003
- Administrator: EAAB - ESP

La Conejera (Spanish: Humedal La Conejera; Spanish pronunciation: [umeðal la konejeɾa]) is a wetland, part of the Wetlands of Bogotá, located in the locality Suba, Bogotá, Colombia. The wetland, in the Juan Amarillo River basin on the Bogotá savanna covers an area of 58.9 hectares (146 acres).

== Flora and fauna ==
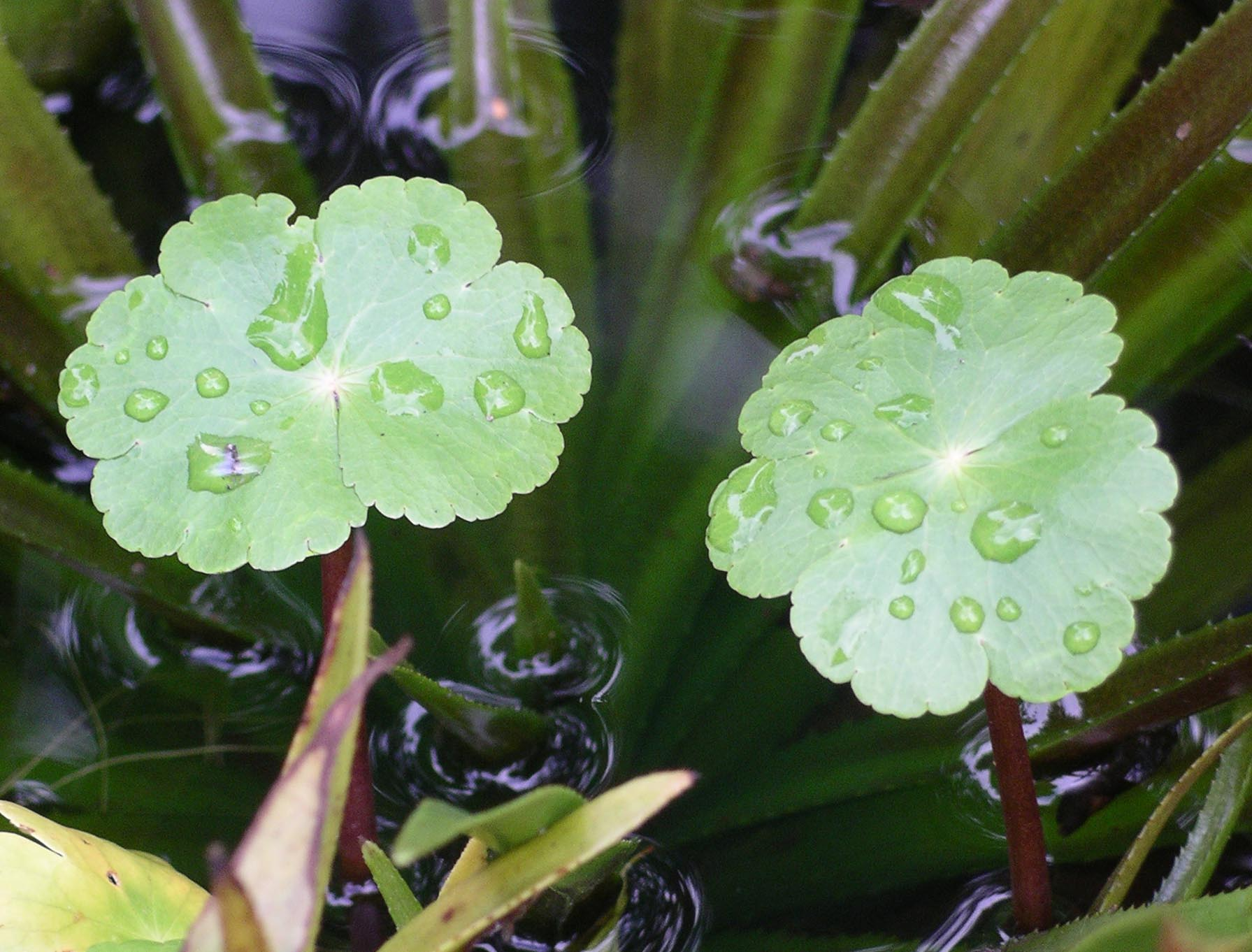
The floating pennywort grows in La Conejera and is a main source of food for the American coot

=== Insects ===
The dragonfly species Ischnura cruzi has been registered in La Conejera, as well as in Santa María del Lago and Metropolitan Park La Florida.

=== Birds ===
La Conejera contains the second-most bird species of the wetlands of Bogotá, after Córdoba Wetland, with 95, of which 6 endemic. The habitat of the American coot has been studied in 2002. The floating pennywort (Hydrocotyle ranunculoides), present in various wetlands of Bogotá, proved essential for the bird.

Endemic species unique for this wetland are:

Name	Species	Image
upland sandpiper	Bartramia longicauda	
Swainson's hawk	Buteo swainsoni	
ruddy ground dove	Columbina talpacoti	
bay-breasted warbler	Dendroica castanea	
red-crowned woodpecker	Melanerpes rubricapillus	
American cliff swallow	Petrochelidon pyrrhonota	

== Panorama ==
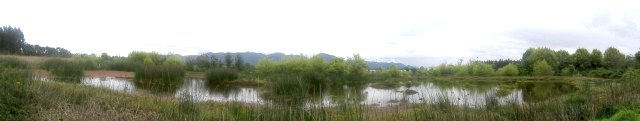
La Conejera Wetland

== See also ==
- Biodiversity of Colombia, Bogotá savanna, Thomas van der Hammen Natural Reserve
- Wetlands of Bogotá
