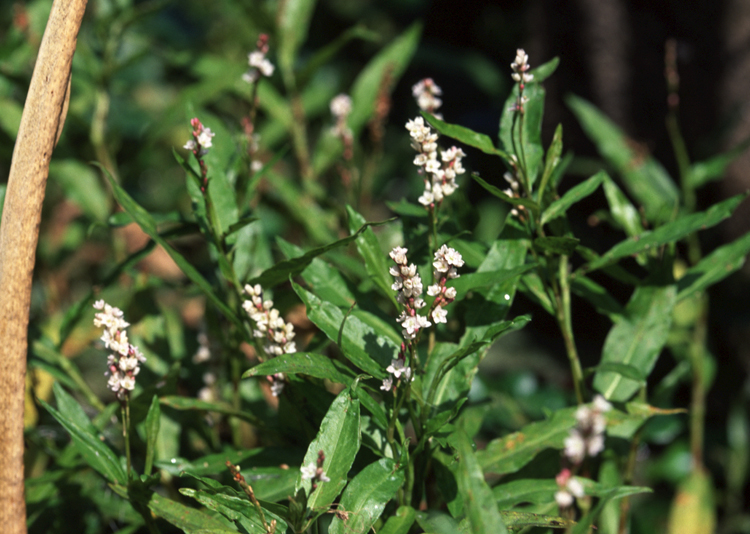

Scientific classification
- Kingdom: Plantae
- Clade: Tracheophytes
- Clade: Angiosperms
- Clade: Eudicots
- Order: Caryophyllales
- Family: Polygonaceae
- Genus: Persicaria
- Species: P. hydropiperoides

Binomial name
- Persicaria hydropiperoides (Michx.) Small

Synonyms
- Polygonum barbatum Walter; Polygonum hydropiperoides Michx.; Polygonum opelousanum Riddell ex Small

= Persicaria hydropiperoides =

Species of plant

Persicaria hydropiperoides, commonly called swamp smartweed, mild waterpepper, false waterpepper, or sometimes simply waterpepper, is a species of flowering plant in the buckwheat family. It has a widespread distribution across much of North America and South America. Its preferred habitat is in moist, saturated to inundated soils growing in full sun to partial shade; such as swamp forests, marshes, streams, shorelines, and ditches. It is sometimes semi-aquatic.

Swamp smartweed is quite variable and is sometimes divided into several varieties, some of which may be better treated as species in their own right.

In general, swamp smartweed is a rhizomatous perennial herb growing upright or erect and approaching a maximum height of one meter (40 inches). Roots may emerge from nodes on the lower stem. The bristly lance-shaped leaves are around 10 centimeters (4 inches) long. The leaves have sheathing stipules known as ochreae. The spike-like inflorescence produces many pinkish flowers each about 3 millimeters wide.

Swamp smartweed is reported to be edible, as are all species in the genus Persicaria. Although its close relatives Persicaria hydropiper and Persicaria punctata are known to possess a hot or pungent quality when consumed, swamp smartweed is said to lack the same pungency by at least one author.
