= El Salitre (wetland) =

Small wetland in Bogotá, Colombia

El Salitre Wetland Humedal El Salitre
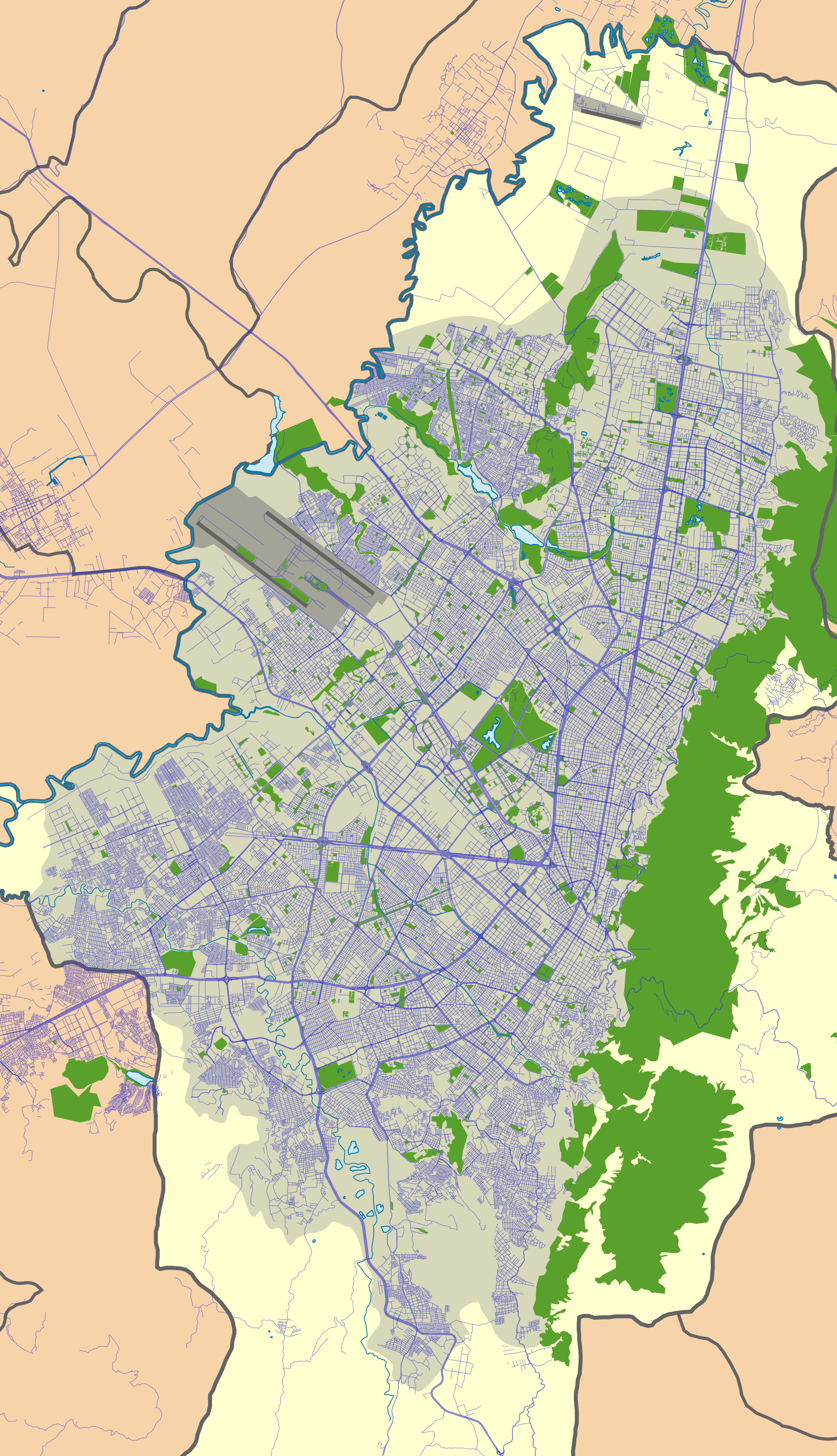
- Location within Bogotá
- Location: Barrios Unidos, Bogotá; Colombia
- Coordinates: 4°40′02.6″N 74°05′17.0″W
- Area: 6.4 ha (16 acres)
- Elevation: 2,558 m (8,392 ft)
- Administrator: EAAB - ESP

El Salitre is a small wetland, one of the wetlands of Bogotá. It is located within Salitre Park, close to Salitre Mágico, an amusement park north of Simón Bolívar Park in the locality Barrios Unidos of the Colombian capital Bogotá. The area of El Salitre is 6.4 hectares (16 acres).

== Flora and fauna ==
=== Birds ===
In El Salitre, 81 species of birds have been recorded.

== See also ==
- Biodiversity of Colombia, Bogotá savanna, Thomas van der Hammen Natural Reserve
- Wetlands of Bogotá, Salitre Mágico
