= Tibabuyes =

Colombian wetland

Tibabuyes Wetland Humedal Tibabuyes
- Juan Amarillo Wetland
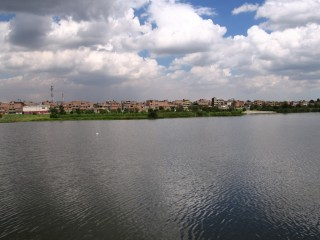
- Tibabuyes Wetland

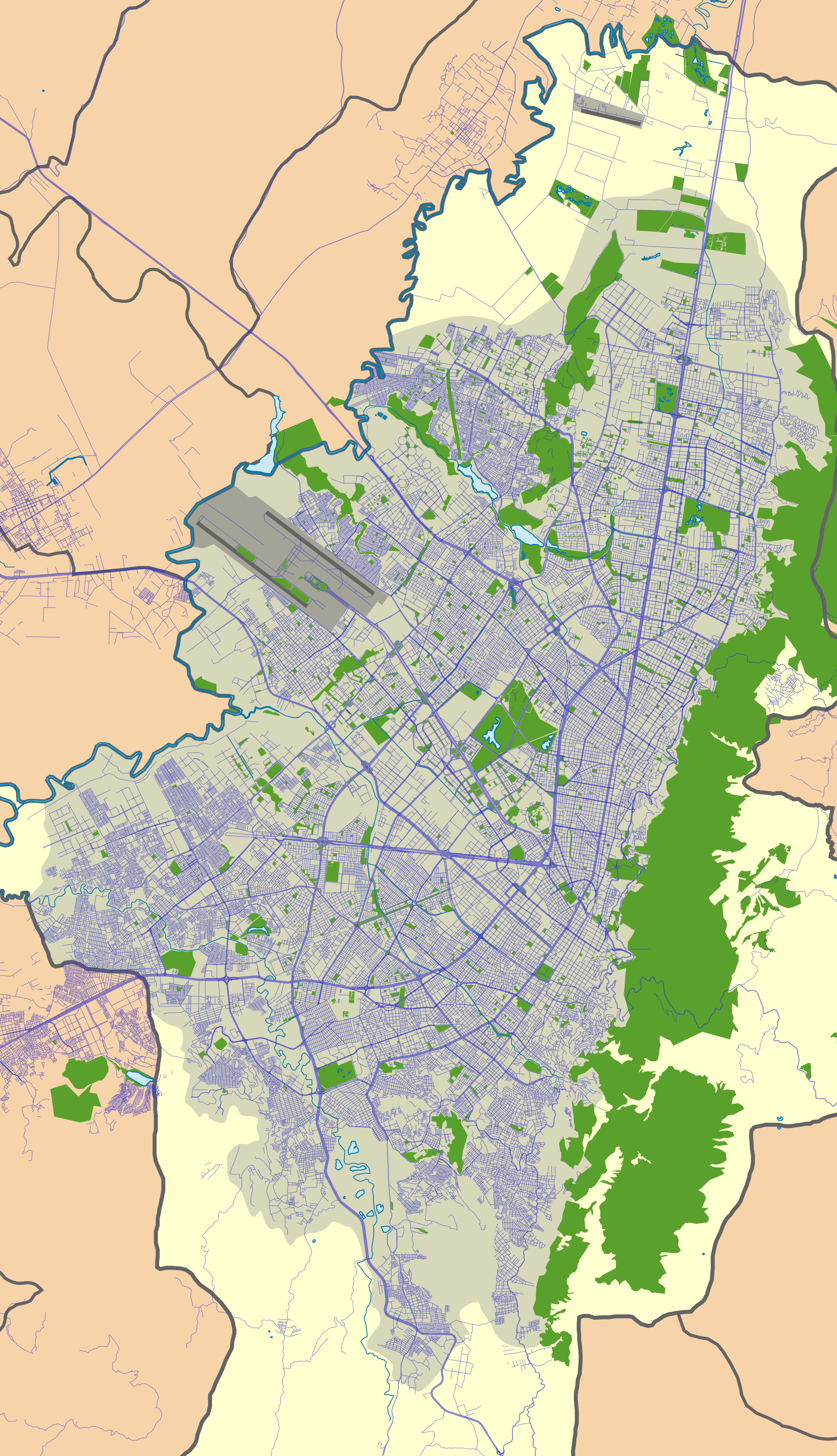
- Location within Bogotá
- Location: Suba, Engativá, Bogotá; Colombia
- Coordinates: 4°43′49.79″N 74°06′34.9″W
- Area: 222.58 ha (550.0 acres)
- Elevation: 2,539 m (8,330 ft)
- Designated: September 2003
- Named for: Muysccubun: "land of the farmers"
- Administrator: EAAB - ESP

Tibabuyes (Spanish: Humedal de Tibabuyes) or Juan Amarillo Wetland is a wetland, part of the Wetlands of Bogotá, located in the localities Suba and Engativá, Bogotá, Colombia. The wetland, in the Juan Amarillo River basin on the Bogotá savanna is the largest of the wetlands of Bogotá and covers an area of 222 hectares (550 acres).

With the planned construction of Avenida Longitudinal de Occidente/Cundinamarca Highway, there will have to be built an overpass, which will affect the wetlands. The indigenous community and the inhabitants of the neighbourhoods surrounding the place are opposed to it.

== Etymology ==
The name Tibabuyes comes from Muysccubun, the language of the indigenous Muisca, who inhabited the Bogotá savanna before the Spanish conquest, and means "land of the farmers".

== Flora and fauna ==
=== Birds ===
Tibabuyes hosts 22 bird species.

== See also ==
- Biodiversity of Colombia, Bogotá savanna, Thomas van der Hammen Natural Reserve
- Wetlands of Bogotá
