= Jaboque =

Jaboque Wetland Humedal Jaboque
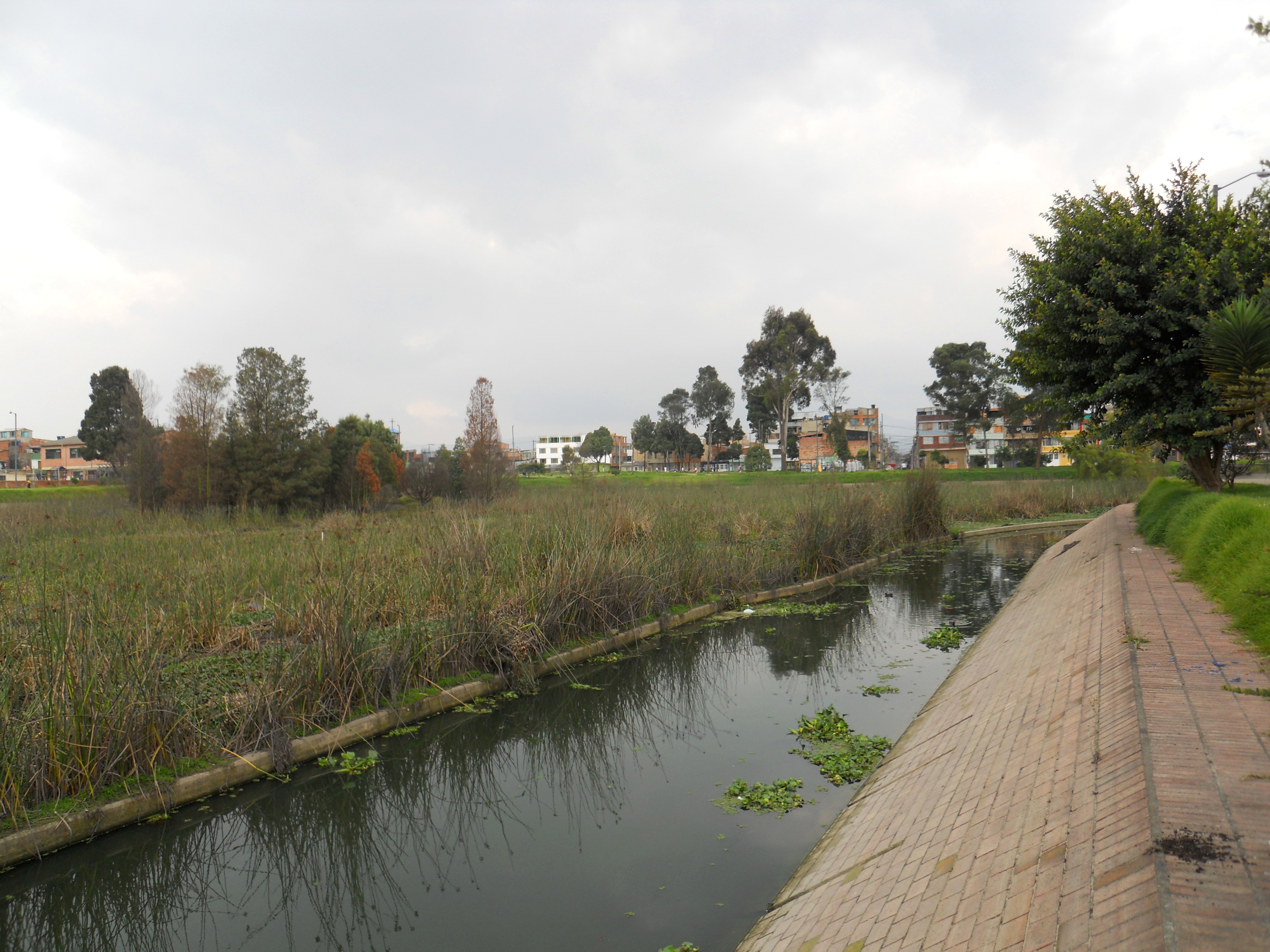
- Jaboque Wetland

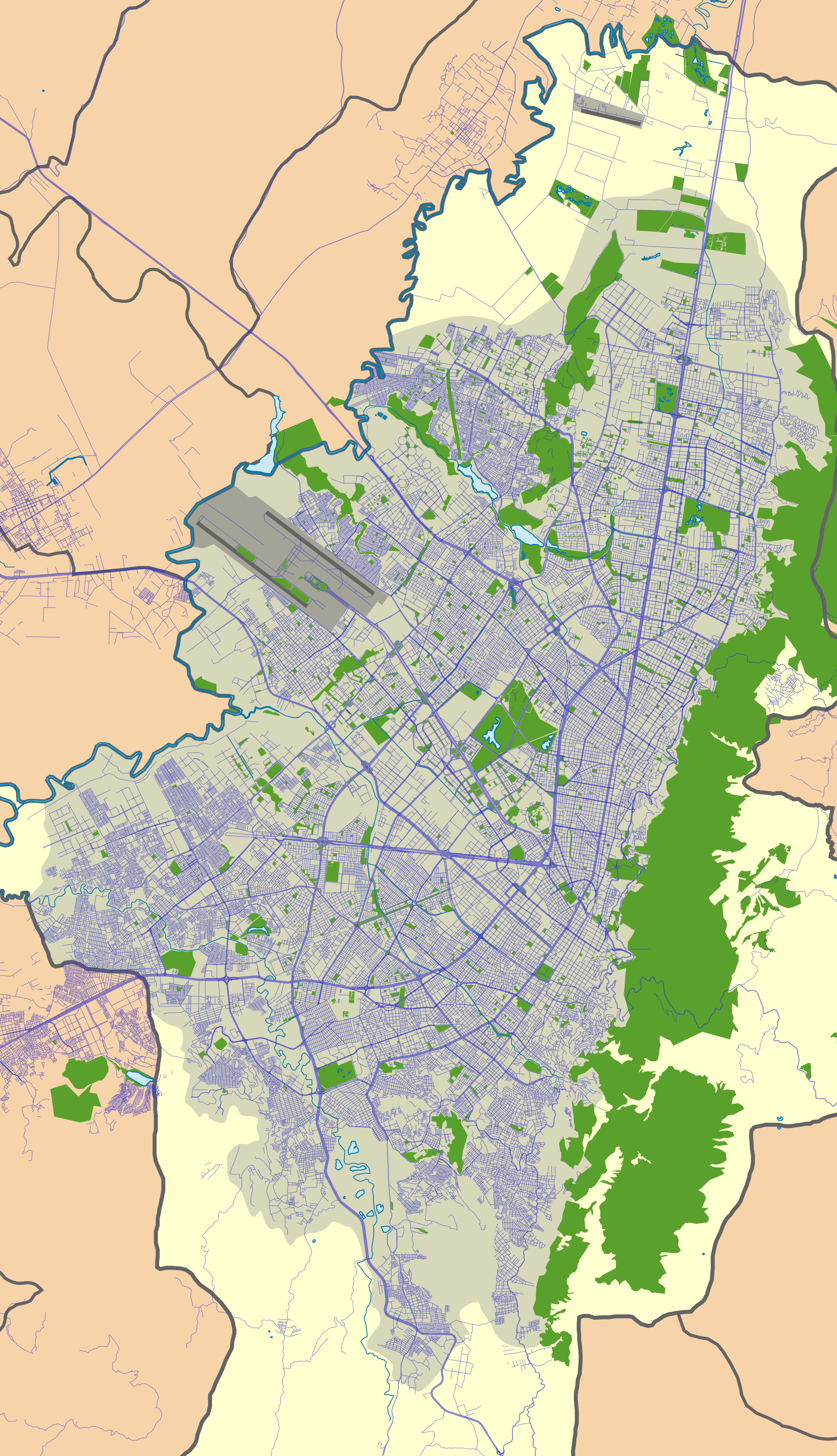
- Location within Bogotá
- Location: Engativá, Bogotá; Colombia
- Coordinates: 4°43′21.3″N 74°08′25.6″W
- Area: 148 ha (370 acres)
- Elevation: 2,539 m (8,330 ft)
- Designated: September 2003
- Named for: Muysccubun: "land of abundance"
- Administrator: EAAB - ESP

Jaboque (Spanish: Humedal de Jaboque) is a wetland, part of the Wetlands of Bogotá, located in the locality Engativá, Bogotá, Colombia. The wetland, close to the Bogotá River on the Bogotá savanna covers an area of 148 hectares (370 acres). The wetland is close to El Dorado International Airport in the Juan Amarillo River basin.

== Etymology ==
Jaboque in Muysccubun, the language of the indigenous Muisca who inhabited the Bogotá savanna before the Spanish conquest, means "land of abundance".

== Flora and fauna ==
=== Birds ===
Jaboque has 81 registered bird species, of which 4 endemic.

Endemic species unique for this wetland are:

Name	Species	Image
great egret	Ardea alba	
cattle egret	Ardeola ibis	
grey-lined hawk	Buteo nitidus	
grey-bellied flowerpiercer	Diglossa carbonaria	

== Gallery ==
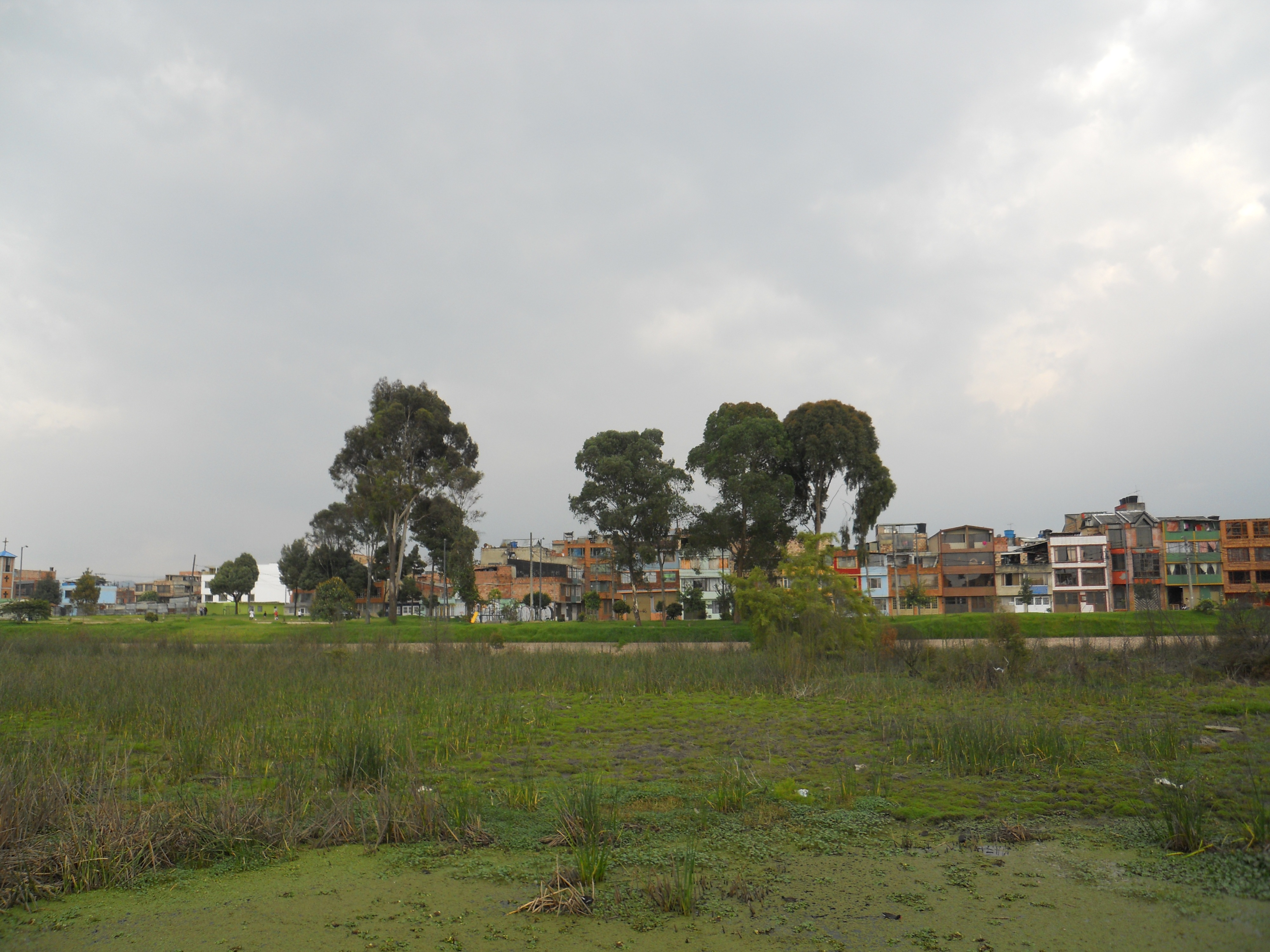

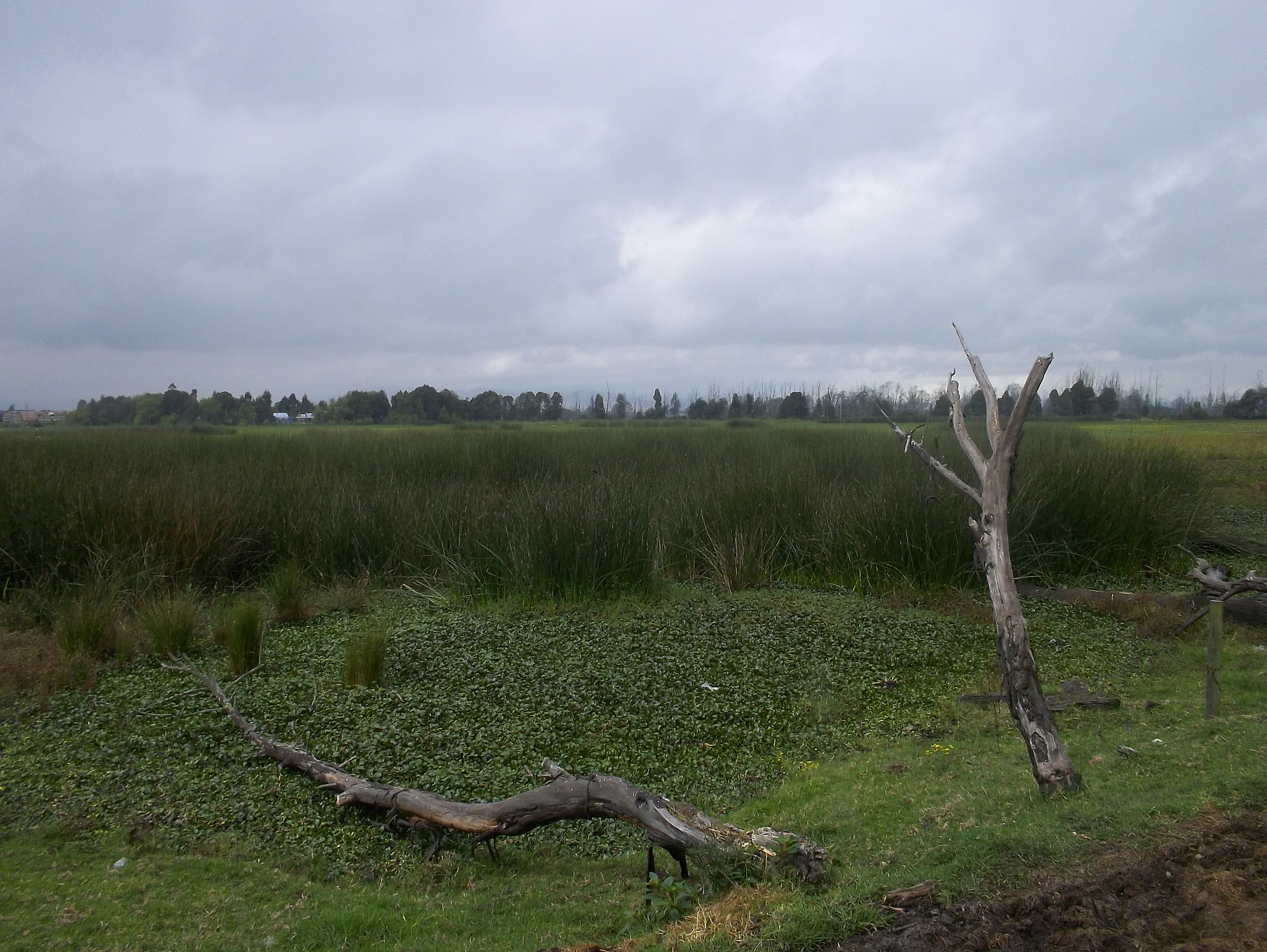

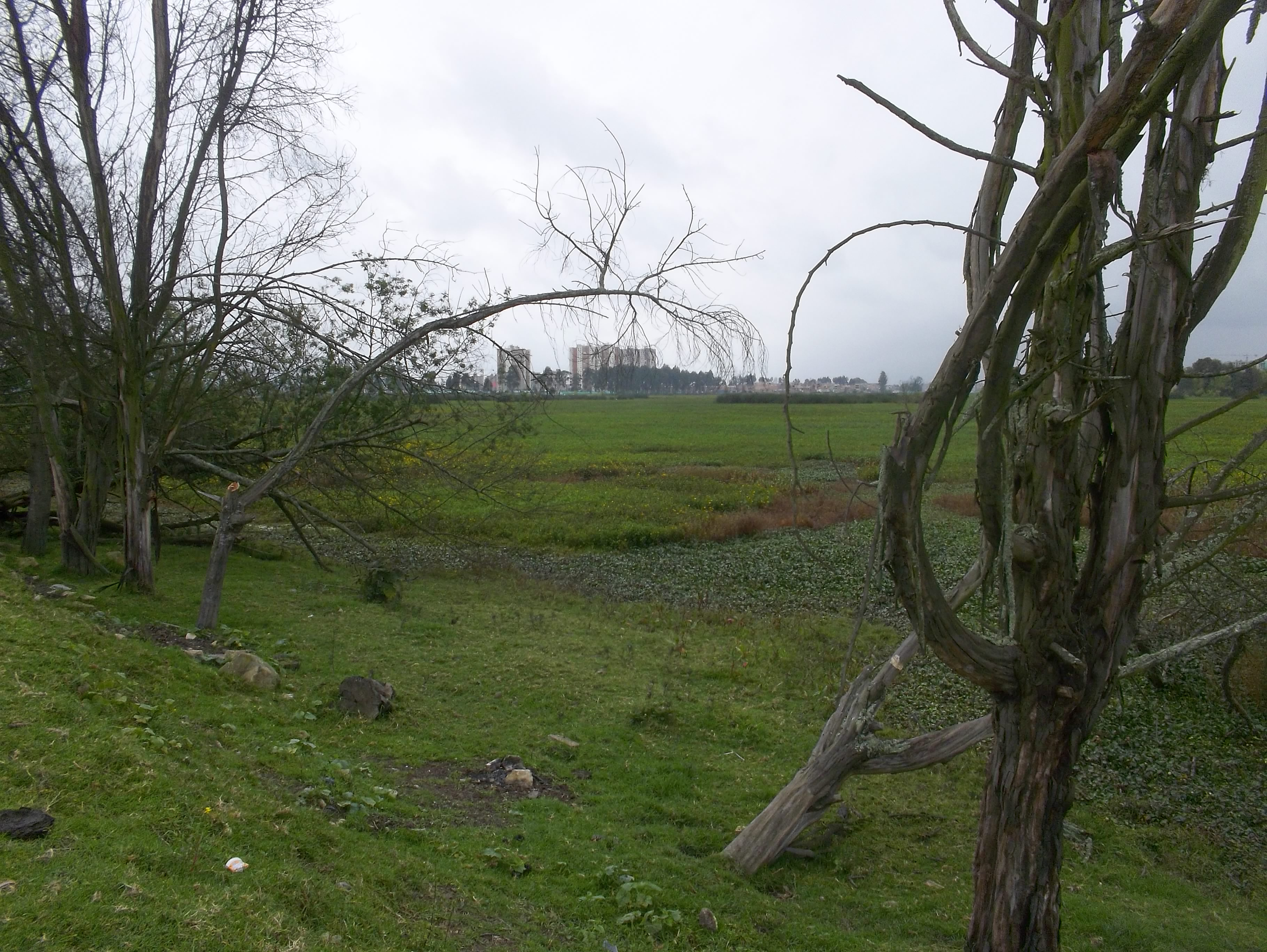

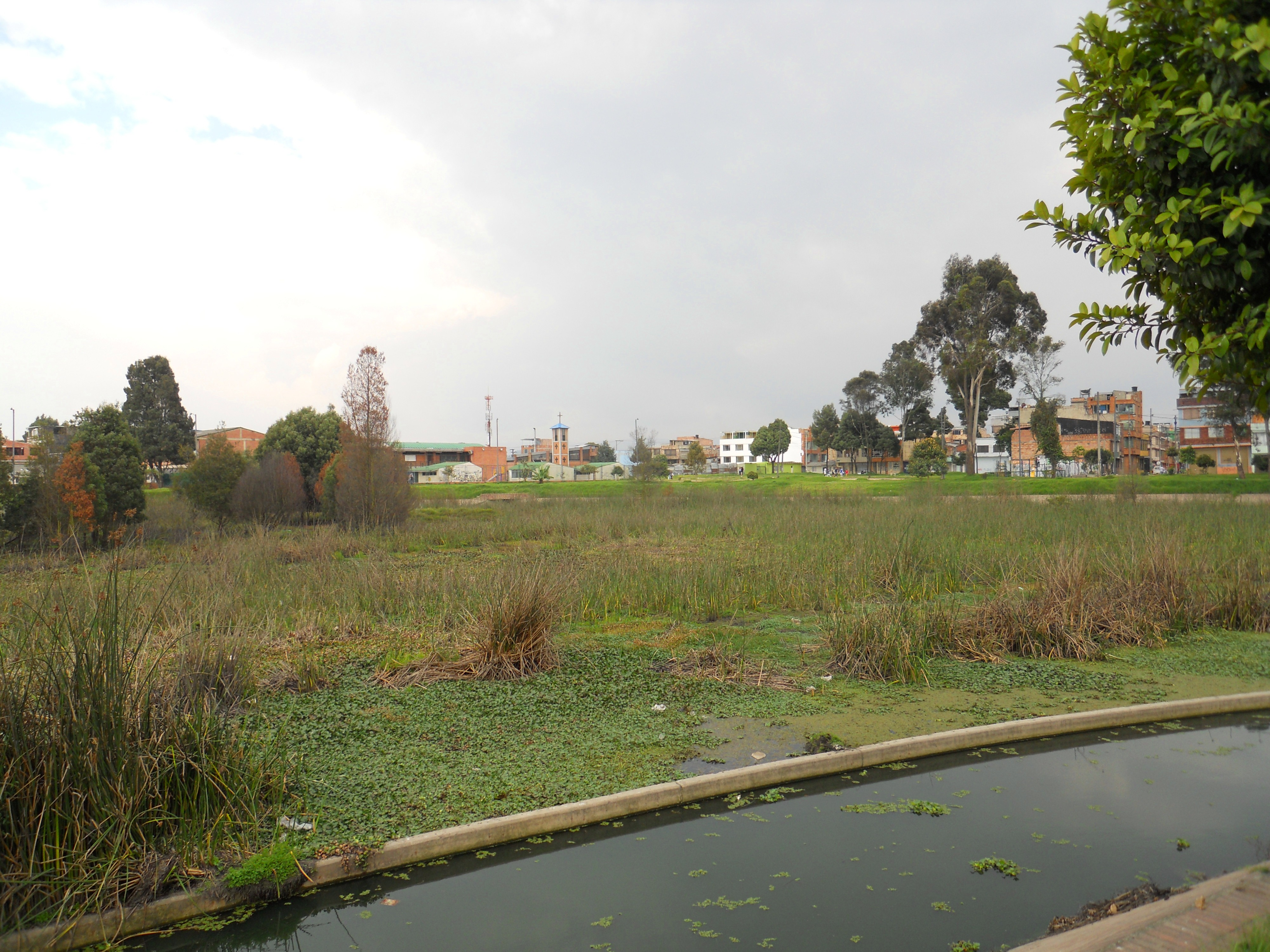

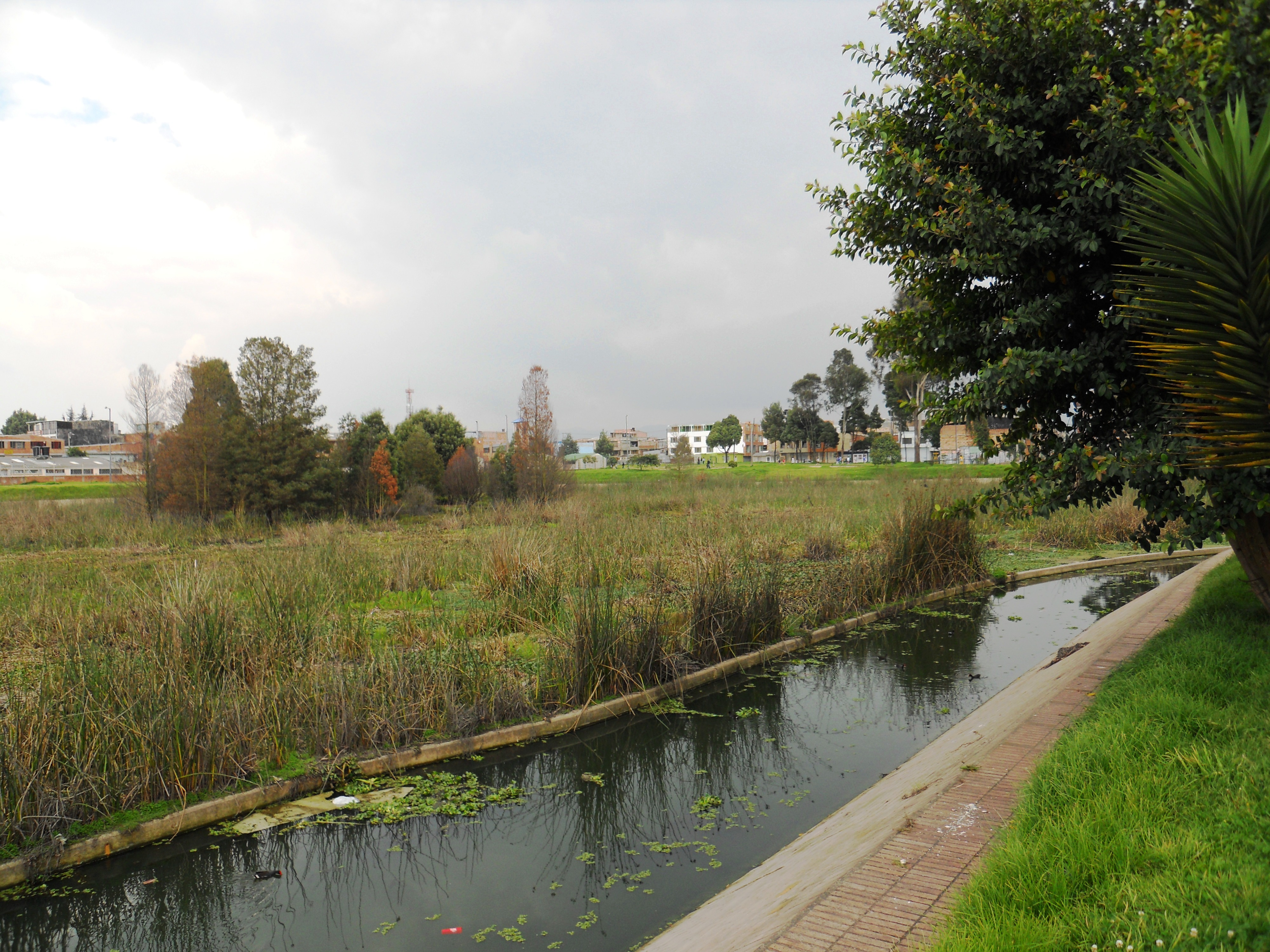

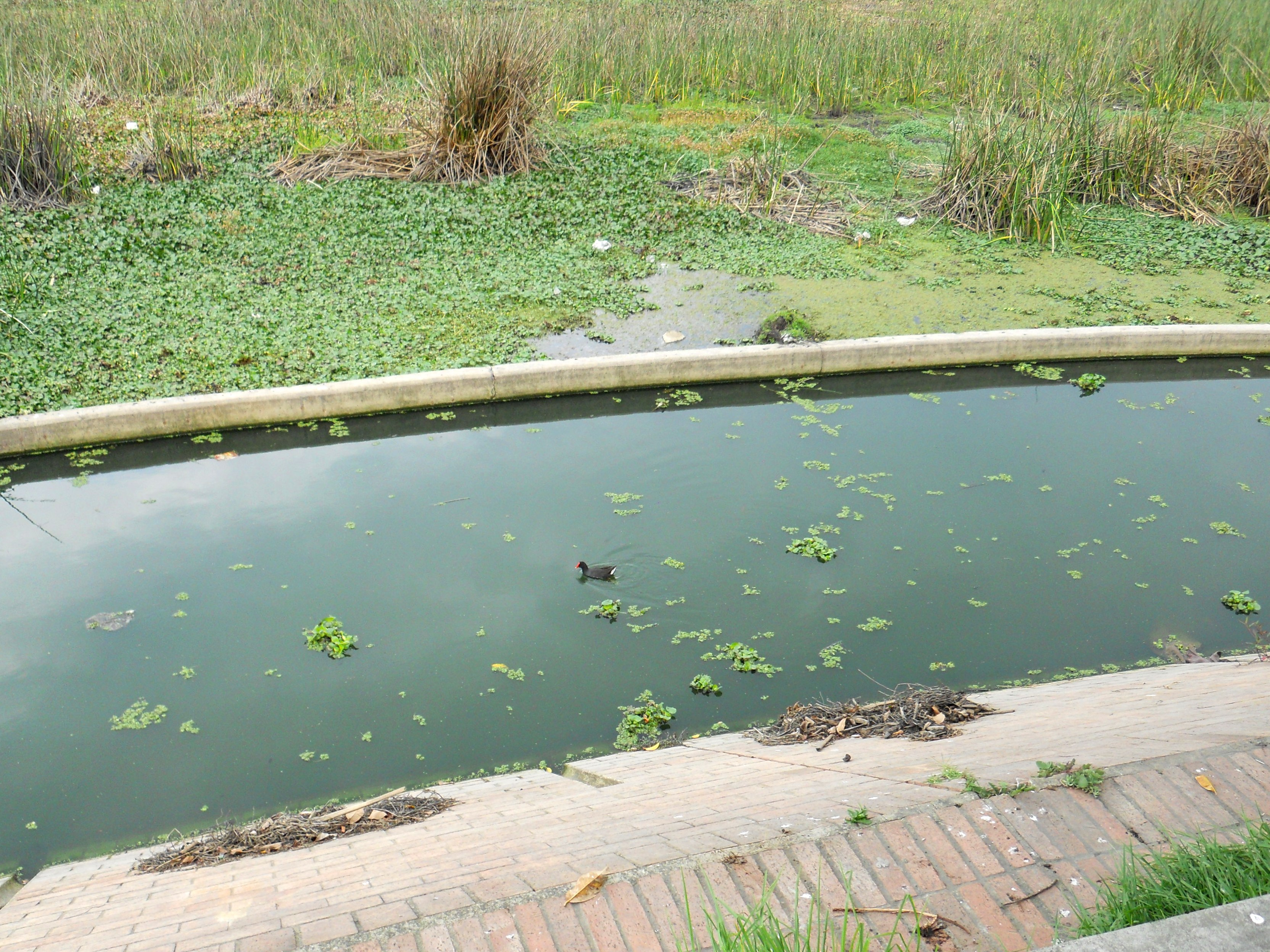

== See also ==
- Biodiversity of Colombia, Bogotá savanna, Thomas van der Hammen Natural Reserve
- Wetlands of Bogotá
