= Barrios Unidos =

- Locality of Bogotá
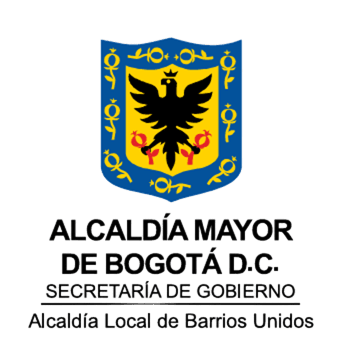
- Coat of arms

- Location of the locality in the city of Bogotá

- Location of the locality in the Capital District of Bogotá
- Coordinates: 4°40′43″N 74°04′43″W
- Country: Colombia
- City: Bogotá D.C.

Area
  - Total: 11.9 km^{2} (4.6 sq mi)
- Elevation: 2,600 m (8,500 ft)

Population (2007)
  - Total: 230,066
  - Density: 19,300/km^{2} (50,100/sq mi)
- Time zone: UTC-5 (Colombia Standard Time)
- Website: Official website

Barrios Unidos is the 12th locality of Bogotá, capital of Colombia. It is located to the northwest of the city, and is mostly inhabited by middle class residents. Barrios Unidos is completely urban, with some light industry and major commercial areas.

== Geography ==
Barrios Unidos borders

- North: Calle 100, bordering the locality of Suba
- South: Calle 63, bordering the locality of Teusaquillo
- East: Autopista Norte and Avenida Caracas, bordering the locality of Chapinero
- West: Avenida Carrera 68, bordering the locality of Engativá

=== Hydrology ===
Several rivers from the Salitre system pass through Barrios Unidos, including the Salitre River.

=== Topography ===
Barrios Unidos is relatively flat, located on the Bogotá savanna.

=== Transportation ===
In addition to the avenues that border the locality, the principal roads that serve it are: Avenida 80, Avenida Calle 68, Avenida NQS, and Carrera 24. Calle 80 and Avenida NQS both have lines of the TransMilenio system.

== Economy ==
Small-scale industry thrives in the area, and it is home to Bogotá's leather, furniture, and footwear districts. Factory direct storefronts are common throughout the locality. Specialty warehouses also exist, primarily focusing on autoparts.

== Points of interest ==
Part of Parque Metropolitano Simón Bolívar is located within Barrios Unidos:

- El Lago Park
- Centro de Alto Rendimiento (fine arts center)
- Salitre Mágico Park

Among the commercial establishments are:

- Cafam Floresta
- Metrópolis shopping center

Barrios Unidos also is home to the Escuela de Cadetes General Santander military school.
