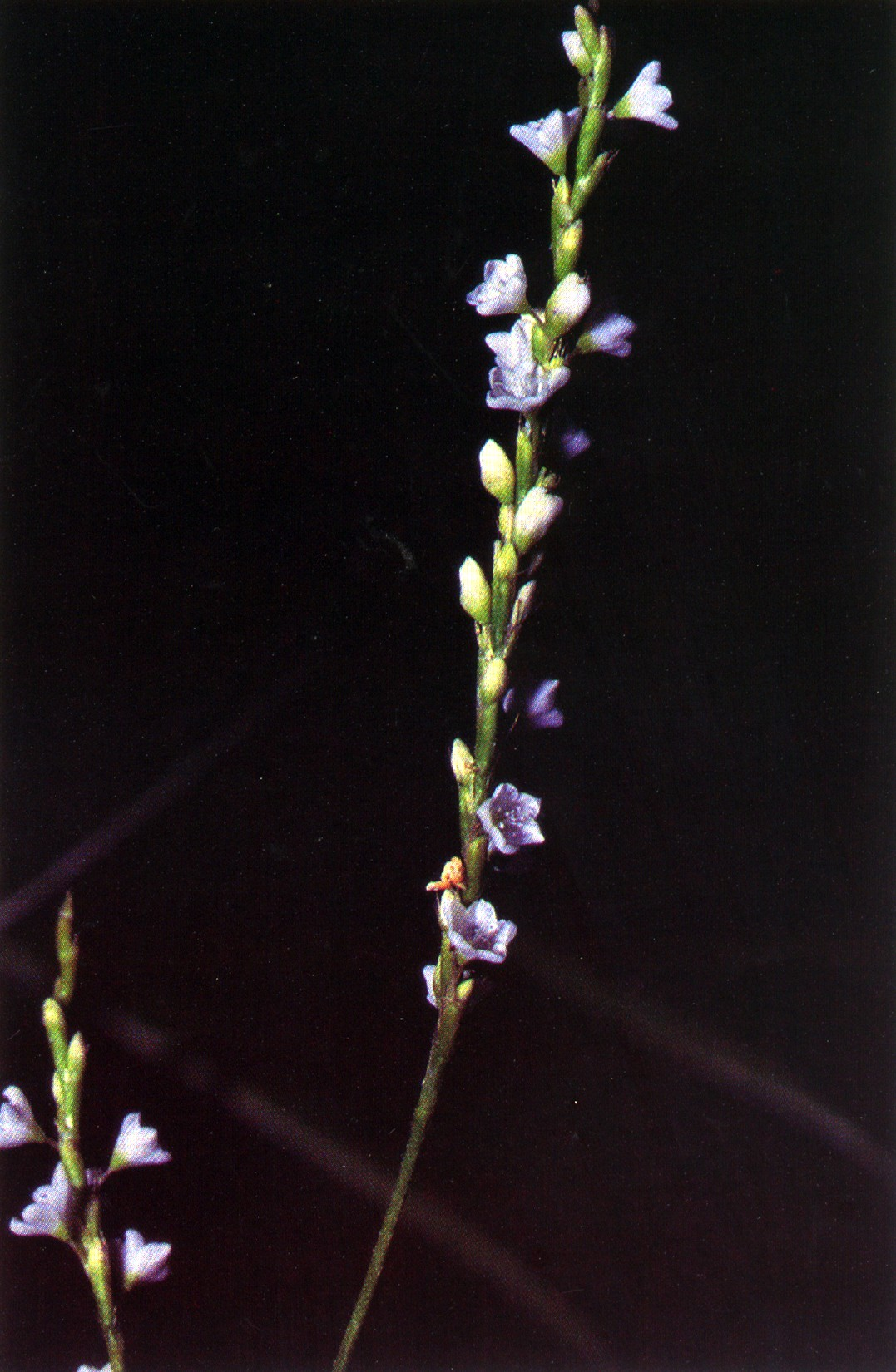

Conservation status
- Least Concern (IUCN 3.1)

Scientific classification
- Kingdom: Plantae
- Clade: Tracheophytes
- Clade: Angiosperms
- Clade: Eudicots
- Order: Caryophyllales
- Family: Polygonaceae
- Genus: Persicaria
- Species: P. punctata

Binomial name
- Persicaria punctata (Elliott) Small

Synonyms
- List: Discolenta punctata (Elliott) Raf.; Mitesia punctata (Elliott) Raf.; Persicaria acris M.Gómez; Persicaria punctata var. breviciliata (Meisn.) H.Hara; Persicaria punctata var. confertiflora (Meisn.) D.Löve & J.-P.Bernard; Persicaria punctata var. eciliata (Small) Small; Persicaria punctata var. leptostachya (Meisn.) Small; Persicaria punctata var. tacubayana Nieuwl.; Polygonum acre Kunth; Polygonum acre f. albiflorum Kuntze; Polygonum acre var. aquatile Meisn.; Polygonum acre var. brachystachyum Meisn.; Polygonum acre var. breviciliatum Meisn.; Polygonum acre var. confertiflorum Meisn.; Polygonum acre var. leptostachyum Meisn.; Polygonum acre var. riparium (Mart.) Meisn.; Polygonum antihaemorrhoidale Mart.; Polygonum antihaemorrhoidale var. aquatile (Mart.) Mart.; Polygonum antihaemorrhoidale f. aquatile Mart.; Polygonum antihaemorrhoidale var. riparium (Mart.) Mart.; Polygonum antihaemorrhoidale f. riparium Mart.; Polygonum distachyum Mart. ex Meisn.; Polygonum eciliatum (Small) W.Stone; Polygonum epilobioides Wedd.; Polygonum gracilescens Mart. ex Meisn.; Polygonum maritimum Vell.; Polygonum punctatum Elliott; Polygonum punctatum var. aquatile (Mart.) Fassett; Polygonum punctatum var. breviciliatum (Meisn.) Steward; Polygonum punctatum var. confertiflorum (Meisn.) Fassett; Polygonum punctatum var. eciliatum Small; Polygonum punctatum var. ellipticum Fassett; Polygonum punctatum var. leptostachyum (Meisn.) Small; Polygonum punctatum var. littorale Fassett; Polygonum punctatum f. longicollum Fassett; Polygonum punctatum var. mexicanum Fassett; Polygonum punctatum var. parviflorum Fassett; Polygonum punctatum var. parvum Vict. & J.Rousseau; Polygonum punctatum var. riparium (Mart.) Fassett; Polygonum punctatum f. stipitatum Fassett; Polygonum punctatum var. tacubayanum (Nieuwl.) Fassett; Polygonum punctatum var. typicum Fassett; Polygonum riparium Mart. ex Meisn.

= Persicaria punctata =

Plant species in the buckwheat family

Persicaria punctata (syn. Polygonum punctatum) is a species of flowering plant in the knotweed family known by the common names dotted smartweed and dotted knotweed.

Persicaria punctata is native to the Americas, where it can be found in moist and wet habitat types from Canada to Argentina including the West Indies. It is an extremely variable plant. It may be annual or perennial.

Persicaria punctata grows from a rhizome and produces decumbent or erect stems which may just exceed one meter (40 in.) in length. The branching stems may root at nodes that come in contact with the substrate. The lance-shaped leaves are up to 15 centimeters long and have stipules widened into bristly brown ochrea that wrap around the stems. The inflorescence is a number of branching clusters of dotted greenish flowers with white edges, sometimes tinged pink.

== Taxonomy ==
In 1817 Stephen Elliott published a new species in the Polygonum genus, naming it Polygonum punctatum. This was moved to Persicaria in 1903 by John Kunkel Small. Togeather with all the other species in its genus it is classified in the Polygonaceae family. The species has no accepted varieties, but there are many among the 43 synonyms listed in Plants of the World Online. Twelve of the synonyms are species names.

Table of Synonyms
Name	Year	Notes
Discolenta punctata (Elliott) Raf.	1838	≡ hom.
Mitesia punctata (Elliott) Raf.	1837	≡ hom.
Persicaria acris M.Gómez	1896	= het., nom. illeg.
Polygonum acre Kunth	1817	= het., nom. illeg. homonym. post.
Polygonum antihaemorrhoidale Mart.	1823	= het.
Polygonum distachyum Mart. ex Meisn.	1856	= het.
Polygonum eciliatum (Small) W.Stone	1911	= het.
Polygonum epilobioides Wedd.	1849	= het.
Polygonum gracilescens Mart. ex Meisn.	1856	= het., not validly publ.
Polygonum maritimum Vell.	1829	= het.
Polygonum punctatum Elliott	1817	≡ hom.
Polygonum riparium Mart. ex Meisn.	1856	= het., not validly publ.
Notes: ≡ homotypic synonym; = heterotypic synonym
