= Meandro del Say =

Colombian wetland

Meandro del Say Humedal Meandro del Say
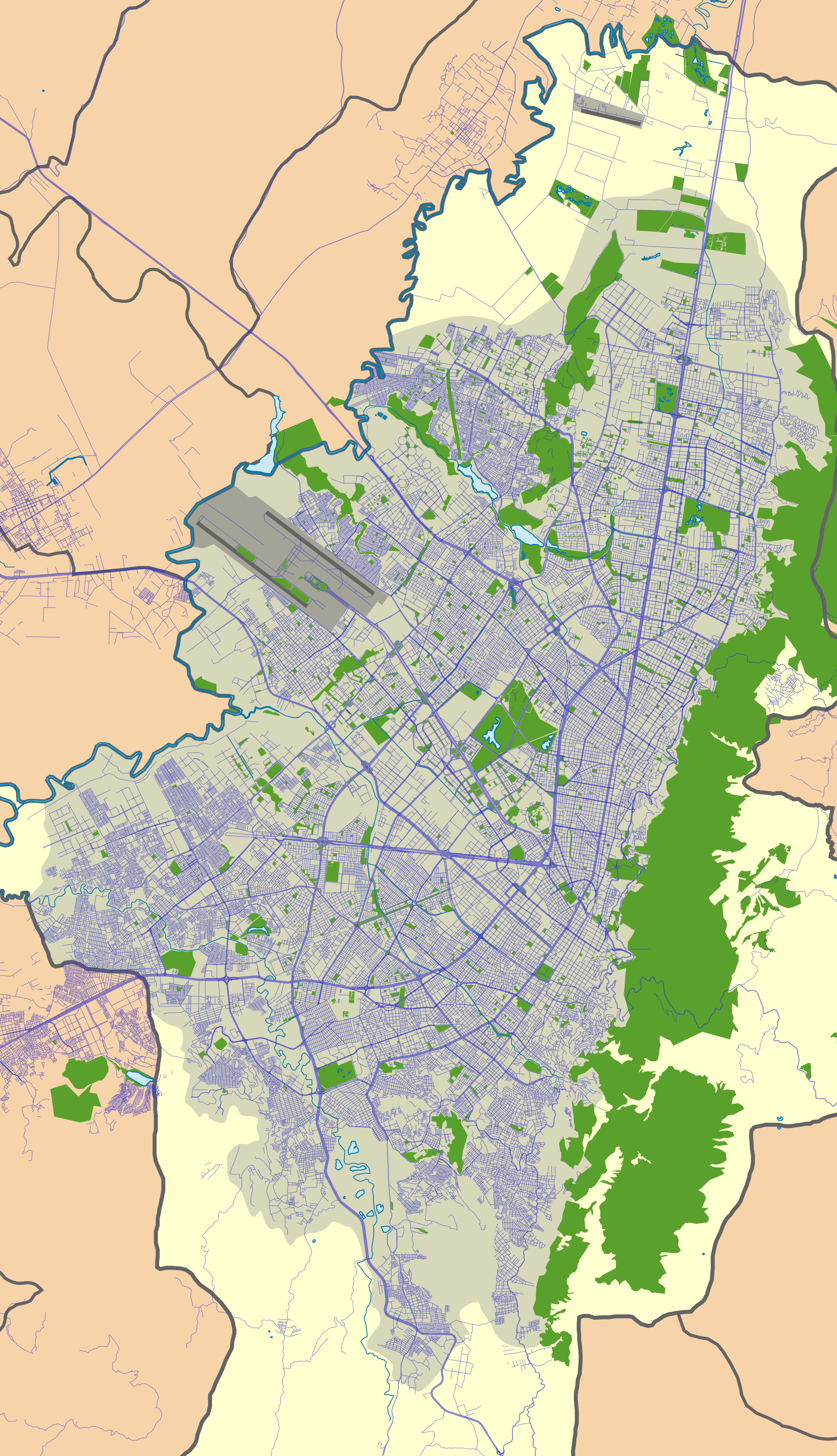
- Location within Bogotá
- Location: Fontibón, Bogotá; Mosquera, Cundinamarca; Colombia
- Coordinates: 4°40′27.4″N 74°09′57.2″W
- Area: 13.6 ha (34 acres)
- Elevation: 2,548 m (8,360 ft)
- Administrator: EAAB - ESP

Meandro del Say is a wetland, part of the wetlands of Bogotá. It spans the locality Fontibón of Bogotá and the eastern part of Mosquera, Cundinamarca. Meandro del Say is located close to the Bogotá River with a total area of 13.6 hectares (34 acres). The Avenida Centenario borders the wetland in the northeast. Meandro de Say is situated in the Fucha River basin.

== Flora and fauna ==
=== Birds ===
In Meandro del Say, 22 bird species have been registered. The wetland hosts among others the blue-winged teal (Anas discors), northern shoveler (Anas clypeata), masked duck (Nomonyx dominicus) and spot-flanked gallinule (Gallinula melanops bogotensis).

== See also ==
- Biodiversity of Colombia, Bogotá savanna, Thomas van der Hammen Natural Reserve
- Wetlands of Bogotá
