= La Isla (wetland) =

La Isla Humedal La Isla
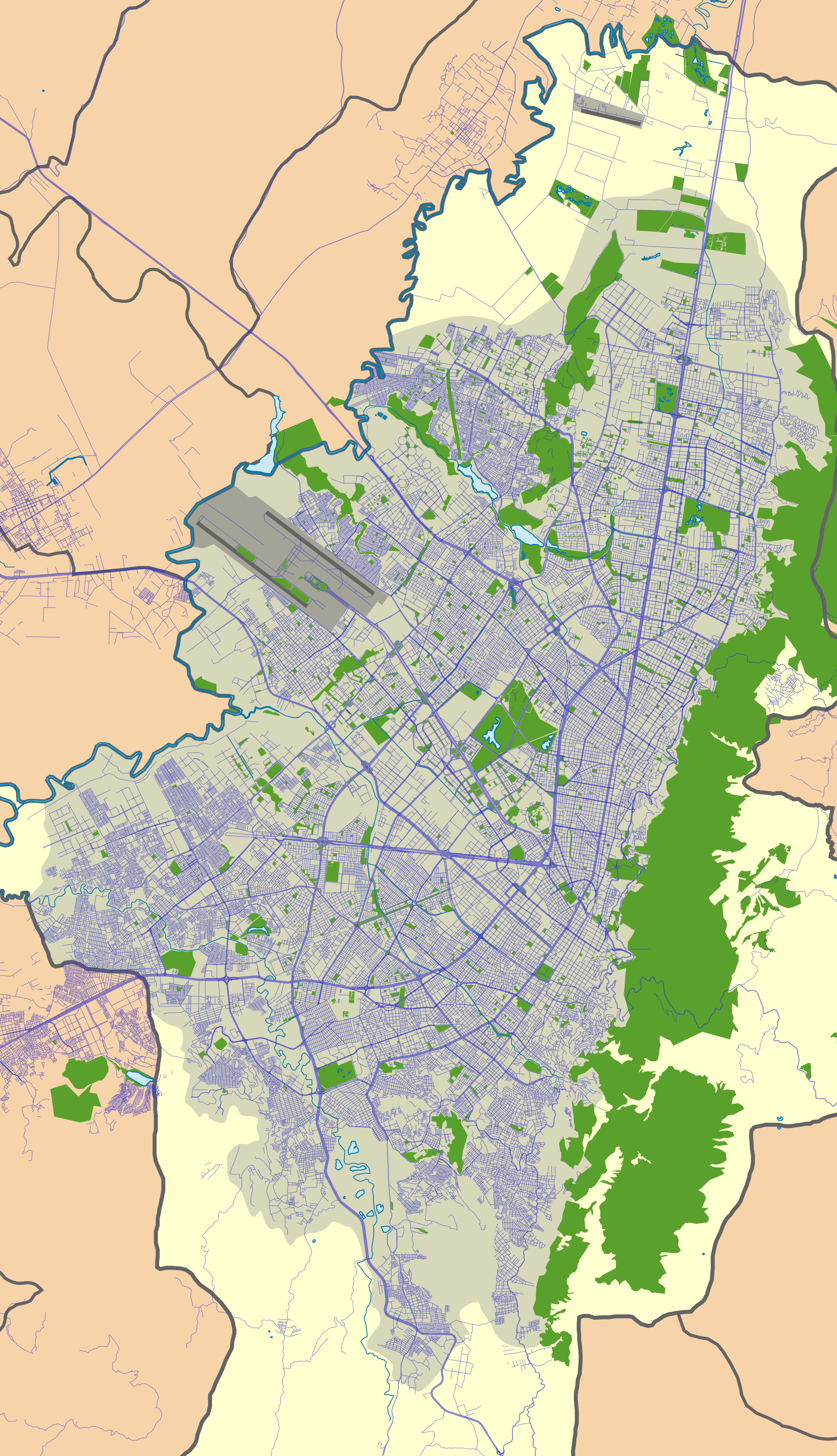
- Location within Bogotá
- Location: Bosa, Bogotá; Colombia
- Coordinates: 4°37′05.2″N 74°12′47.3″W
- Area: 7.7 ha (19 acres)
- Elevation: 2,550 m (8,370 ft)
- Administrator: EAAB - ESP

La Isla is a small wetland, part of the wetlands of Bogotá. It is located next to the Tunjuelo River in the locality Bosa, Bogotá, Colombia. The Bogotá River passes 800 metres (2,600 ft) south of the wetland with an area of 7.7 hectares (19 acres).

== See also ==
- Biodiversity of Colombia, Bogotá savanna, Thomas van der Hammen Natural Reserve
- Wetlands of Bogotá
