= Fucha River =

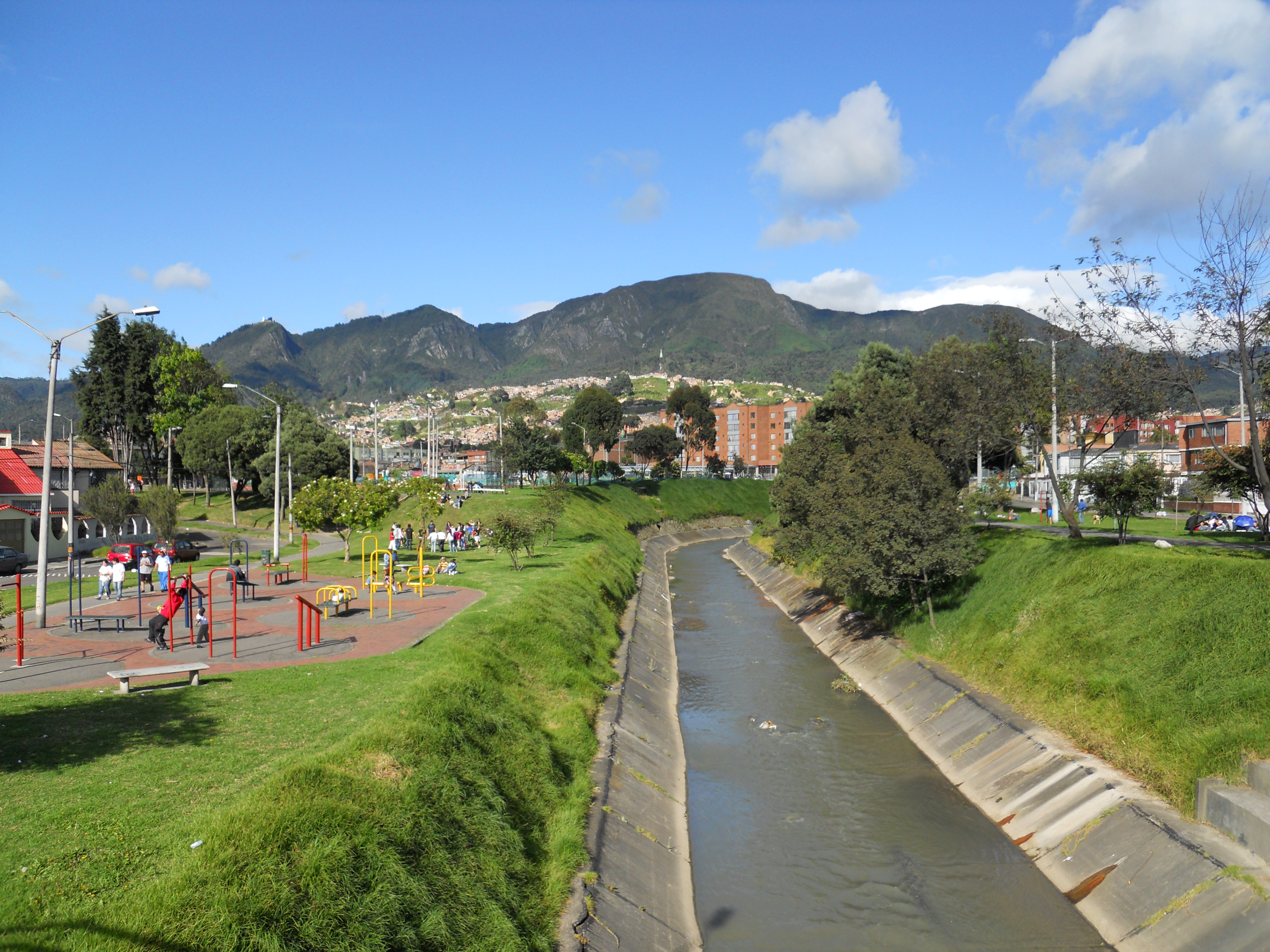

- Location of the Fucha River in Colombia
- Etymology: Muysccubun: "her", "female"
- Native name: Río Fucha (Spanish)

Location
- Country: Colombia
- Department: Cundinamarca
- Municipalities: Bogotá
- Localities: San Cristóbal; Antonio Nariño; Tunjuelito; Ciudad Bolivar; Kennedy; Bosa

Physical characteristics
- Source: Eastern Hills
  - coordinates: 4°33′48.0″N 74°03′52.7″W
- Mouth: Bogotá River
  - location: Bosa
  - coordinates: 4°39′44.6″N 74°09′34.2″W

Basin features
- River system: Bogotá River; Magdalena Basin; Caribbean Sea

The Fucha River is a river on the Bogotá savanna and a left tributary of the Bogotá River. The river originates in the Eastern Hills of the Colombian capital Bogotá and flows westward through the city into the Bogotá River. It is one of the three important rivers of the city, together with the Tunjuelo and Juan Amarillo Rivers.

== Etymology ==
Fucha is derived from Muysccubun, the indigenous language of the Muisca, who inhabited the Bogotá savanna before the Spanish conquest and means "her" or "female".

== Description ==
Source and mouth of the Fucha River on the Bogotá savanna

The Fucha River originates in the locality San Cristóbal in the Eastern Hills of Bogotá and is named in its upper course Quebrada Manzanares, San Cristóbal, Arzobispo and San Francisco River. It flows north from the Tunjuelo River westward and respectively forms the boundary between the localities Rafael Uribe Uribe (south) and Antonio Nariño (north) and Tunjuelito and Ciudad Bolivar (south) and Kennedy (north) of the Colombian capital and is canalised between the Carrera Séptima and the Avenida Boyacá. South of the locality Bosa, the Fucha River flows into the Bogotá River. The Fucha River is highly contaminated.

=== Wetlands ===
Four of the fifteen protected wetlands of Bogotá are located in the Fucha River basin.

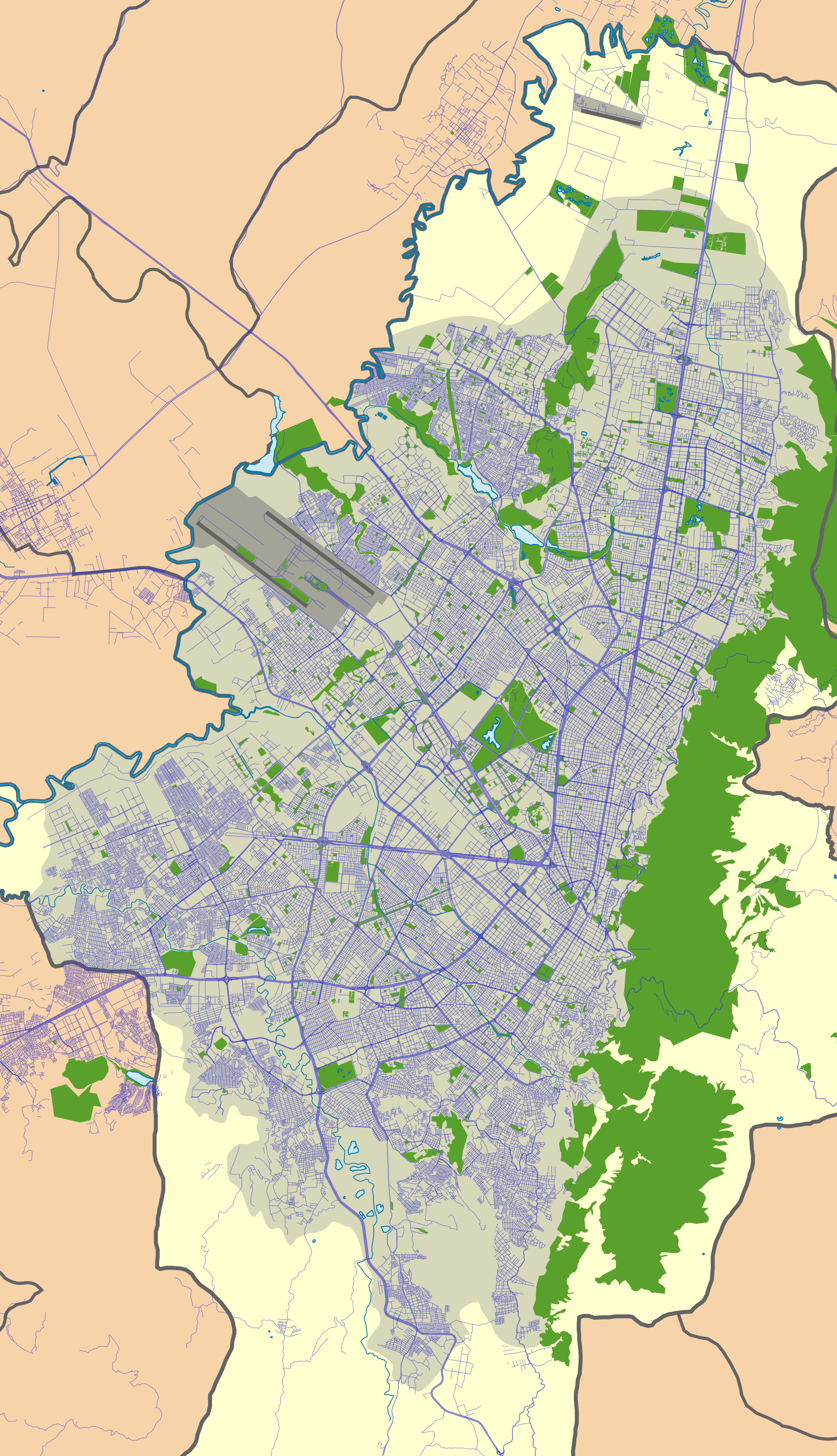
Wetlands within the Fucha River basin

Wetland	Location	Altitude (m)	Area (ha)	Notes	Image
Capellanía	Fontibón	2542	27.05		
Meandro del Say	Fontibón; Mosquera	2548	13.6		
Techo	Techo, Kennedy	2545	11.46		
El Burro	Kennedy	2541	18.84		

== Gallery ==
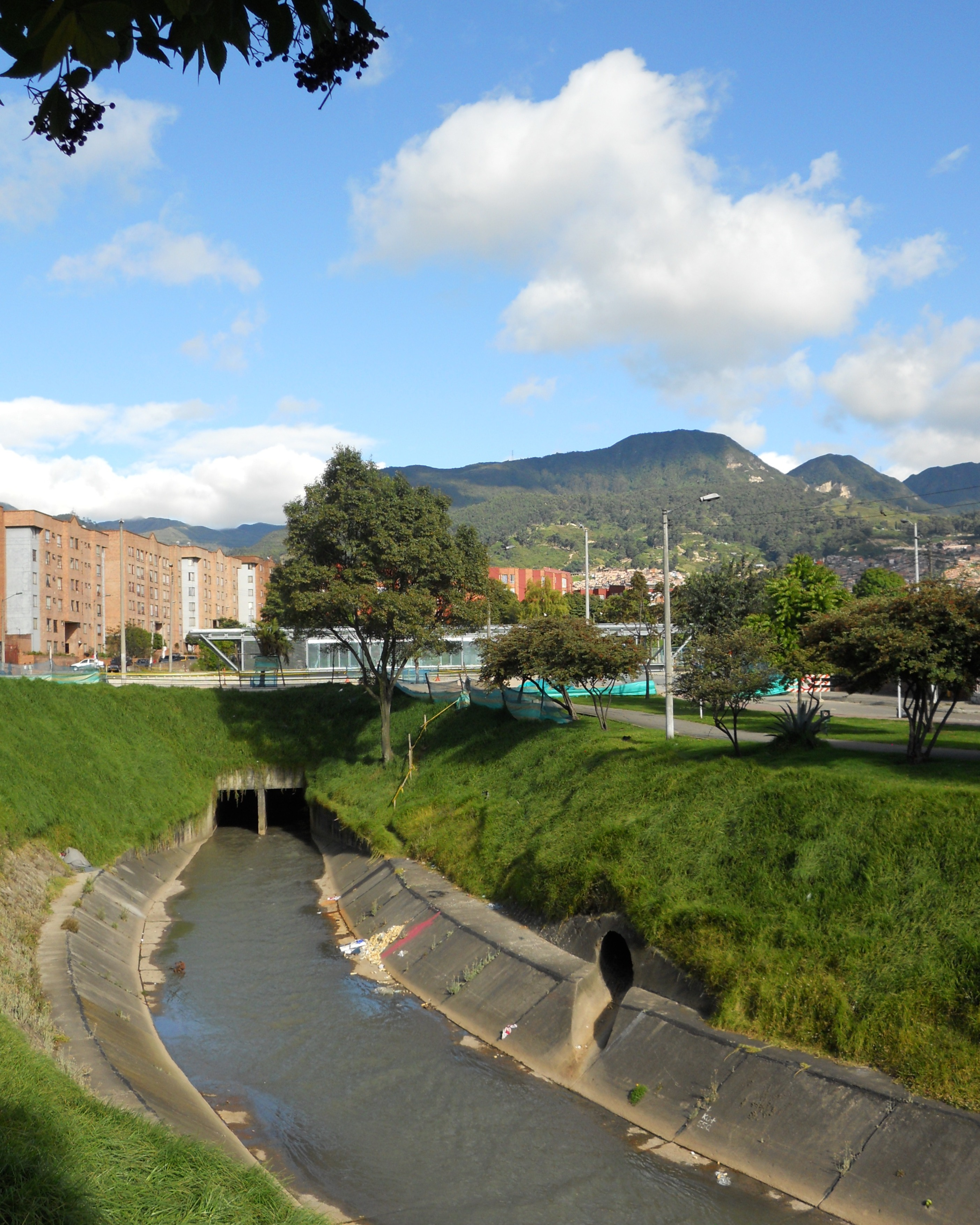
Canalised part close to carrera 10

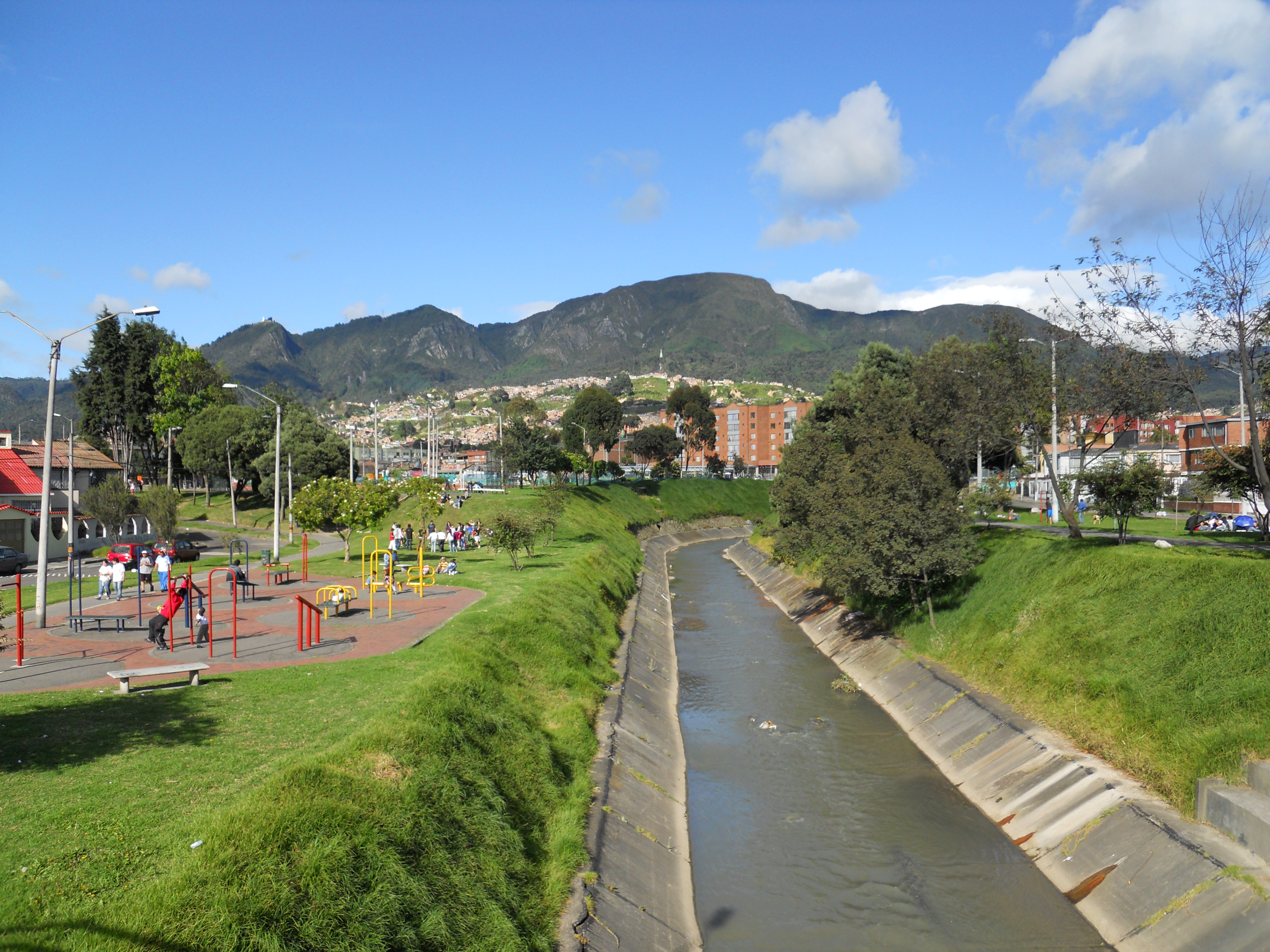
Canalised part close to carrera 12

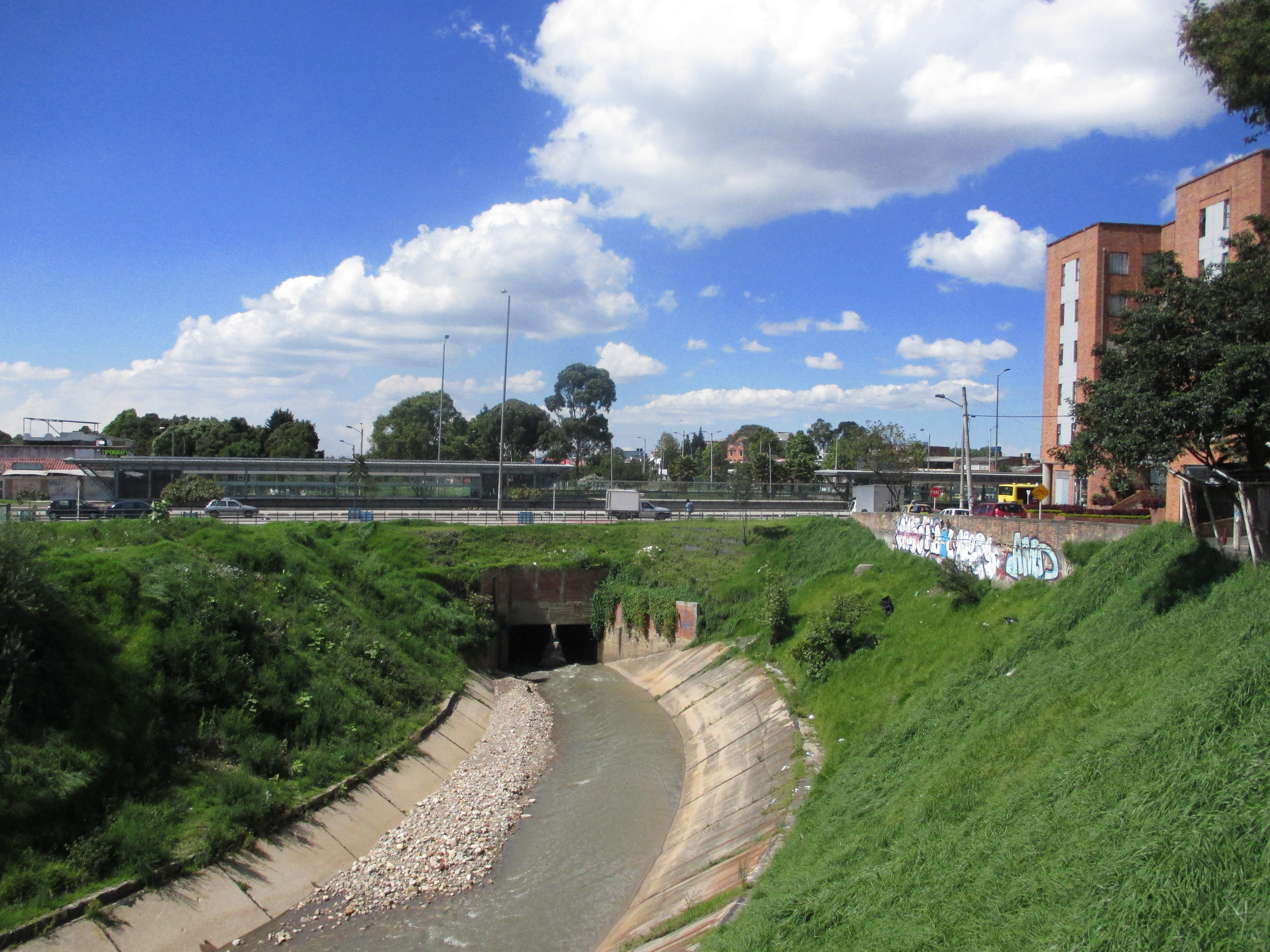
Canalised part close to Ciudad Jardín

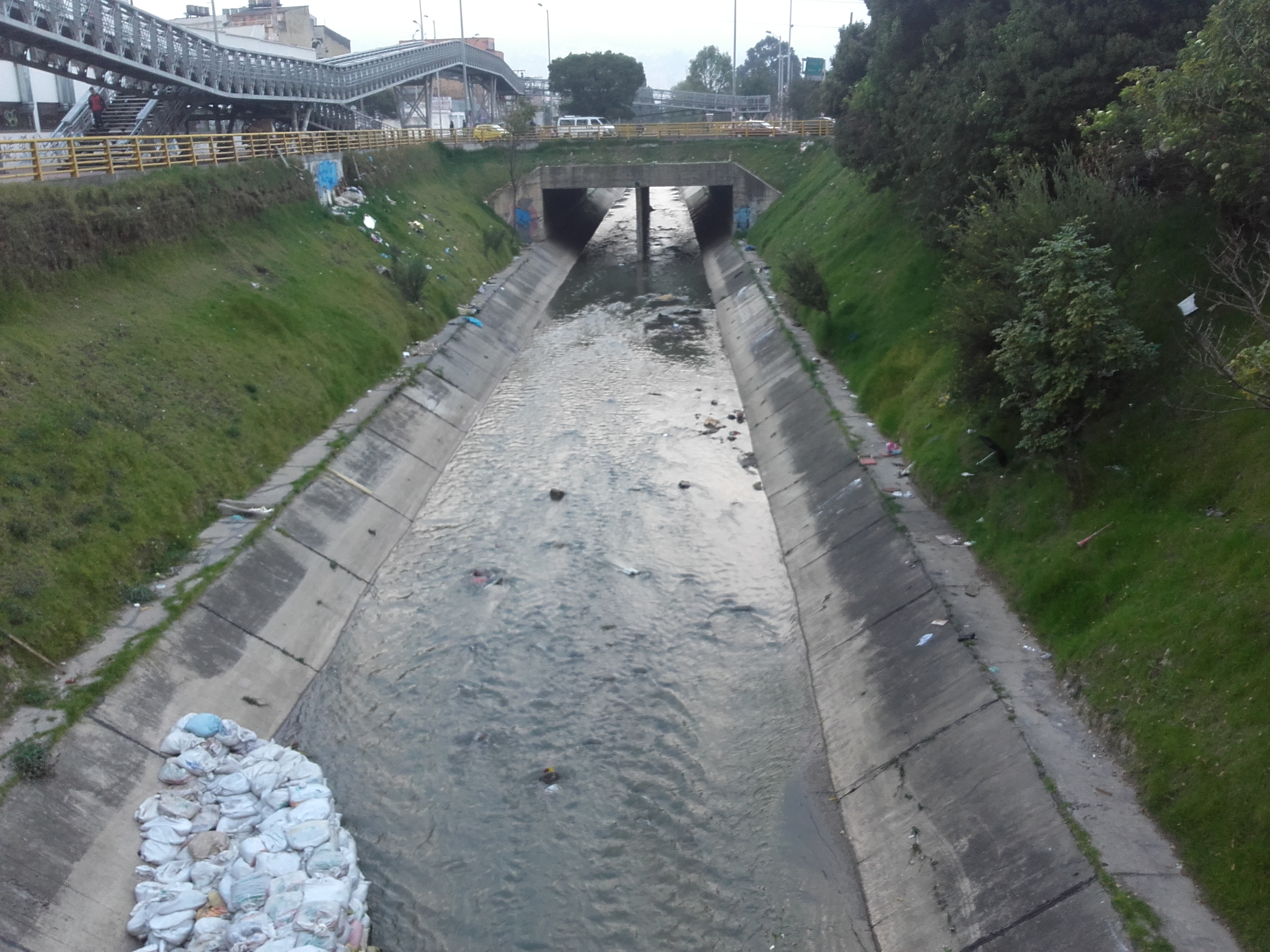
Canalised part

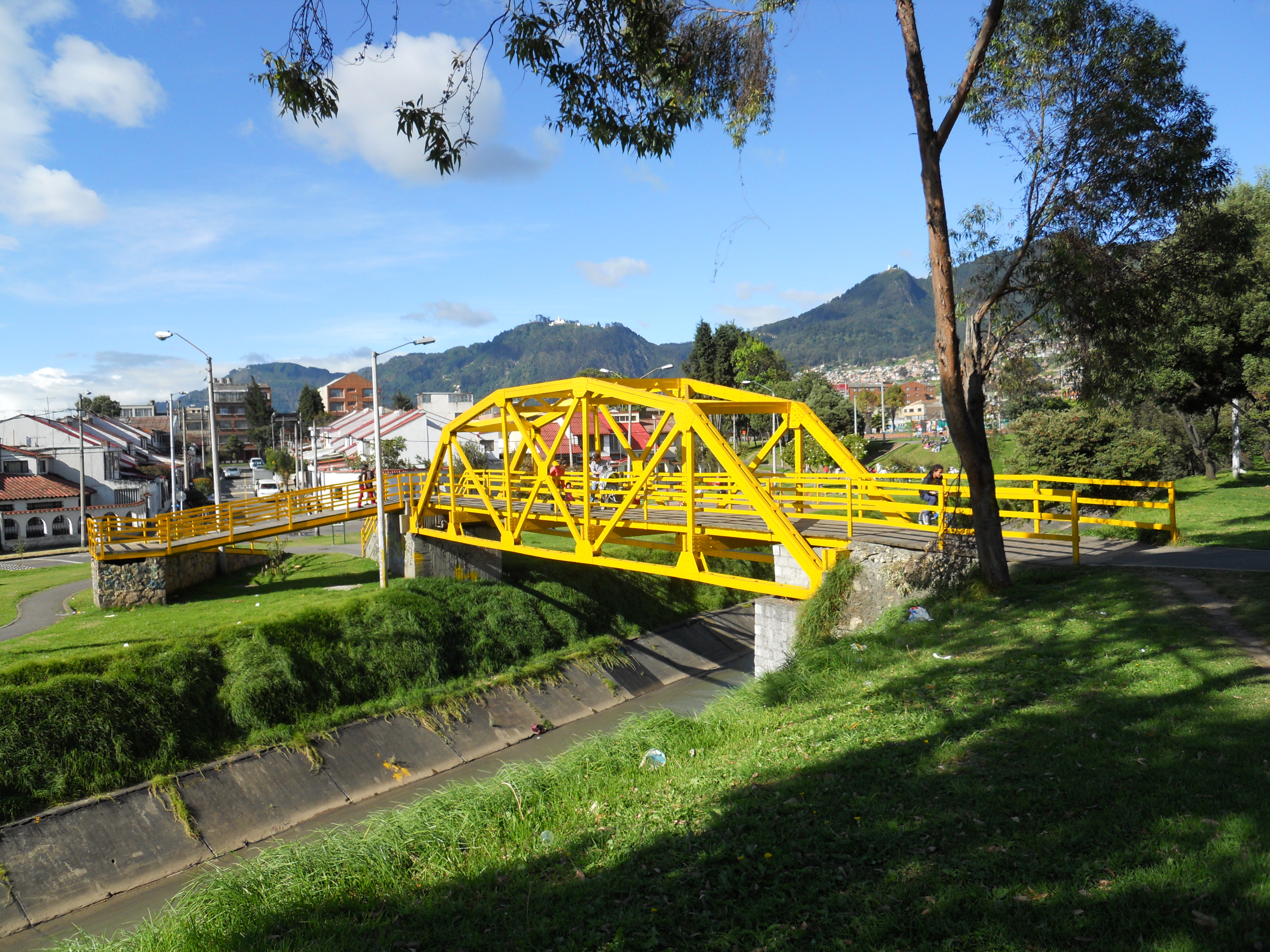
Bridge over the Fucha River

== See also ==
- List of rivers of Colombia
- Eastern Hills, Bogotá
- Bogotá savanna
- Juan Amarillo River, Tunjuelo River
