= Soacha River =

- Location of the Soacha River in Colombia
- Etymology: Muysccubun: "man of the Sun"
- Native name: Río Soacha (Spanish)

Location
- Country: Colombia
- Department: Cundinamarca
- Municipalities: Soacha; Bogotá
- Locality: Ciudad Bolívar (Bogotá)

Physical characteristics
- Source: Sumapaz foothills
  - location: Ciudad Bolívar
  - coordinates: 4°32′12.3″N 74°10′23.3″W
- Mouth: Bogotá River
  - location: Soacha
  - coordinates: 4°34′41.5″N 74°15′07.1″W

Basin features
- River system: Bogotá River; Magdalena Basin; Caribbean Sea

The Soacha River is a river on the Bogotá savanna and a left tributary of the Bogotá River.

== Etymology ==
Soacha is derived from Muysccubun, the indigenous language of the Muisca, who inhabited the Bogotá savanna before the Spanish conquest and means "man of the Sun".

== Description ==
Source and mouth of the Soacha River on the Bogotá savanna

The Soacha River originates in the eastern part of the locality of Bogotá Ciudad Bolívar. It flows through the municipality Soacha before flowing into the Bogotá River. The type locality of the Cacho Formation is located in the Soacha River basin.

== See also ==
- List of rivers of Colombia
- Bogotá savanna
- Tunjuelo River
