= Tibanica =

Wetland in Bogotá, Colombia

Tibanica Wetland Humedal Tibanica
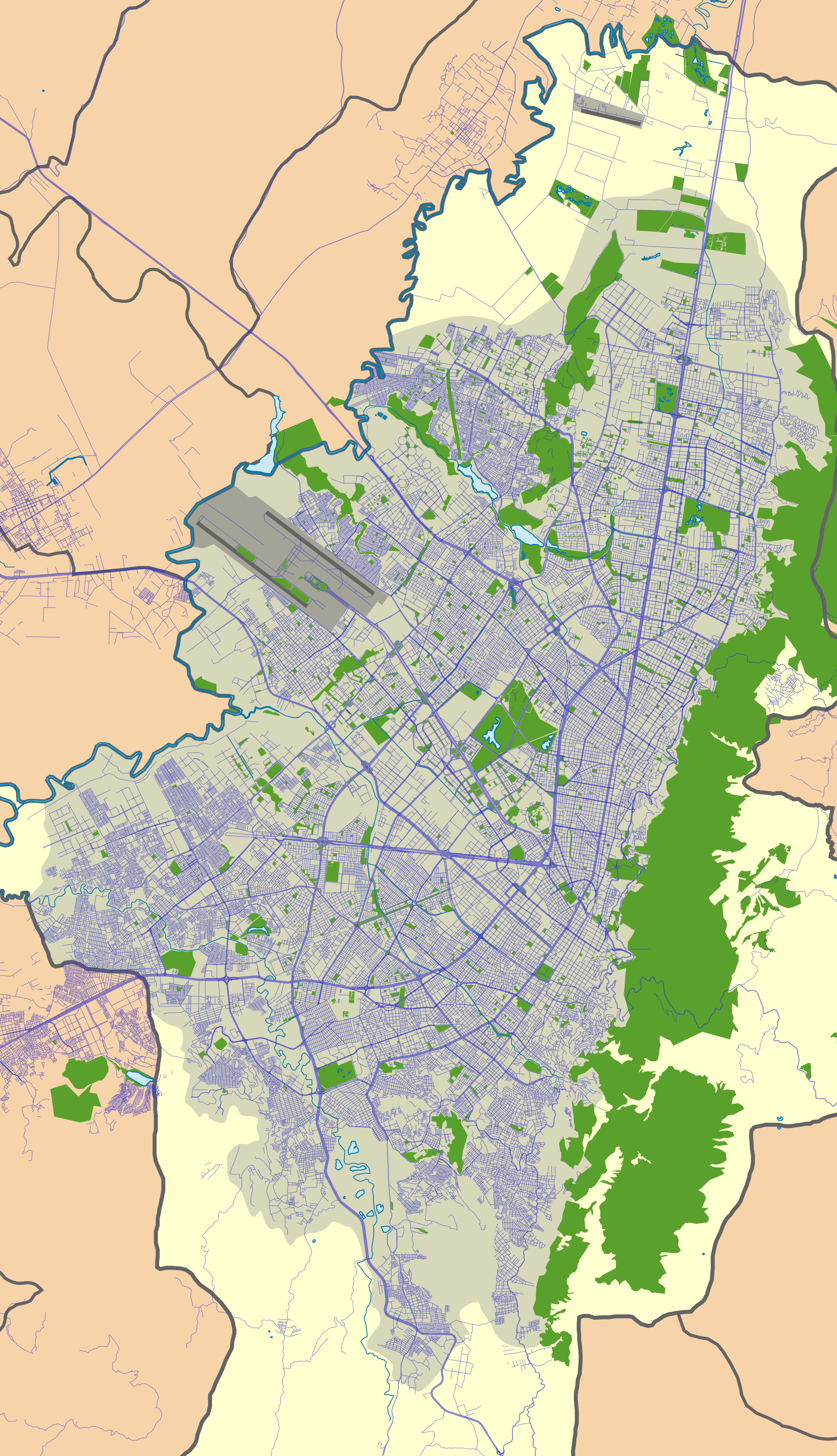
- Location within Bogotá
- Location: Bosa, Bogotá; Soacha, Cundinamarca; Colombia
- Coordinates: 4°36′07.5″N 74°12′15.9″W
- Area: 28.8 ha (71 acres)
- Elevation: 2,542 m (8,340 ft)
- Designated: September 2003
- Named for: Muysccubun: "portal of the altars"
- Administrator: EAAB - ESP

Tibanica (Spanish: Humedal Tibanica) is a wetland, part of the Wetlands of Bogotá, located on the border of the locality Bosa, Bogotá and Soacha, Cundinamarca, Colombia. The wetland on the Bogotá savanna covers an area of about 28.8 hectares (71 acres). Tibanica is located in the Tunjuelo River basin.

== Etymology ==
The name Tibanica has its origin in Muysccubun, the language of the Muisca Confederation, the former country on the Altiplano Cundiboyacense before the Spanish conquest. Tiba means "lord", niki; "gate, altar" and ica or icu refers to the supreme being in the Muisca religion, Chiminigagua or the afterlife. The accepted meaning is thus "portal of the altars"; the entrance to a sacred place for the indigenous Muisca.

== Flora and fauna ==
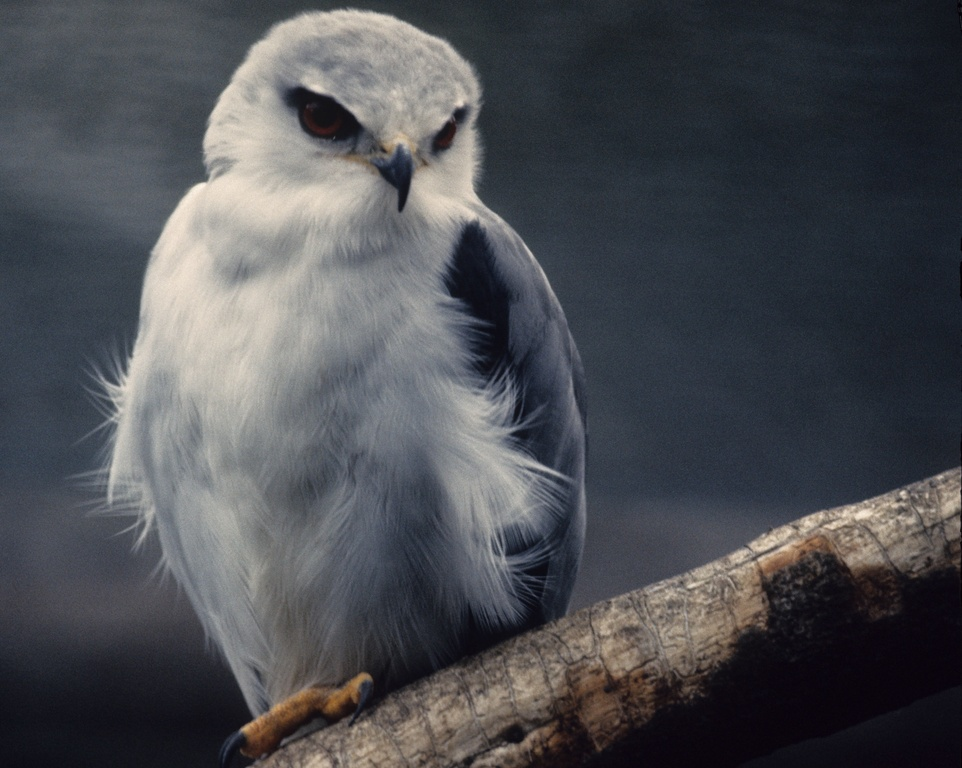
The black-winged kite is of the wetlands of Bogotá uniquely registered in Tibanica

=== Flora ===
Flora registered in Tibanica are among others Senna viarum, Humboldt's willow (Salix humboldtiana), common duckweed (Lemna minor), common cattail (Typha latifolia), and Juncus bogotensis.

=== Birds ===
In Tibanica, 24 bird species have been registered, of which one endemic, uniquely to this wetland, the black-winged kite (Elanus caeruleus).

Other bird species as the Bogotá rail (Rallus semiplumbeus), spot-flanked gallinule (Gallinula melanops bogotensis), and Apolinar's wren (Cistothorus apolinari), named after Colombian monk and ornithologist Apolinar María, have been spotted in Tibanica.

== See also ==
- Biodiversity of Colombia, Bogotá savanna, Thomas van der Hammen Natural Reserve
- Wetlands of Bogotá
