= Subachoque River =

- Location of the Subachoque River in Colombia
- Etymology: Muysccubun: "work of the Sun" or "farmfields of the front"
- Native name: Río Subachoque (Spanish)

Location
- Country: Colombia
- Department: Cundinamarca
- Municipalities: Facatativá; El Rosal; Madrid

Physical characteristics
- Source
  - coordinates: 4°51′58.6″N 74°18′16.1″W
- Mouth: Bojacá River
  - location: Mosquera
  - coordinates: 4°40′48.7″N 74°15′23.2″W

Basin features
- River system: Bojacá River; Bogotá River; Magdalena Basin; Caribbean Sea

The Subachoque River is a river on the Bogotá savanna and a right tributary of the Bogotá River.

== Etymology ==
Subachoque is derived from the indigenous language of the Muisca, who inhabited the Bogotá savanna before the Spanish conquest and means either "work of the Sun" of "farmfields of the front".

== Description ==
Source and mouth of the Subachoque River on the Bogotá savanna

The Subachoque River originates in the easternmost part of Facatativá, Cundinamarca, west of Bogotá. It flows through the municipalities El Rosal, and Madrid before joining the Bojacá River in Mosquera and forming the Balsillas downstream part of the Bojacá River, flowing into the Bogotá River.

== See also ==
- List of rivers of Colombia
- Bogotá savanna
