= Madelena =

- Barrio
- Country: Colombia
- Department: Distrito Capital
- City: Bogotá

Madelena is a neighbourhood (barrio) of Bogotá, Colombia, located in Ciudad Bolívar locality.
