= Bojacá River =

- Location of the Bojacá River in Colombia
- Etymology: Muysccubun: "purple enclosure"
- Native name: Río Bojacá (Spanish)

Location
- Country: Colombia
- Department: Cundinamarca
- Municipalities: Facatativá; Funza; Bojacá; Mosquera; Bogotá
- Localities: Fontibón (Bogotá)

Physical characteristics
- Source
  - location: Facatativá
  - coordinates: 4°52′29.4″N 74°21′31.4″W
- Mouth: Bogotá River
  - location: Fontibón
  - coordinates: 4°36′56.9″N 74°14′59.0″W

Basin features
- River system: Bogotá River; Magdalena Basin; Caribbean Sea

The Bojacá River is a river on the Bogotá savanna and a right tributary of the Bogotá River.

== Etymology ==
Bojacá is derived from Muysccubun, the indigenous language of the Muisca, who inhabited the Bogotá savanna before the Spanish conquest and means "purple enclosure".

== Description ==
Source and mouth of the Bojacá River on the Bogotá savanna

The Bojacá River originates at the western edge of the Bogotá savanna and flows from the northwest to the southeast through the municipalities Facatativá, Funza, Mosquera and the locality Fontibón of Bogotá before joining the Bogotá River. The southeastern portion of the Bojacá River, after the confluence with the Subachoque River, is called Balsillas. The Bojacá River flows just north of Lake Herrera.

== See also ==
- List of rivers of Colombia
- Bogotá savanna
