= Tunjuelo River =

Tunjuelo River Tunjuelito River
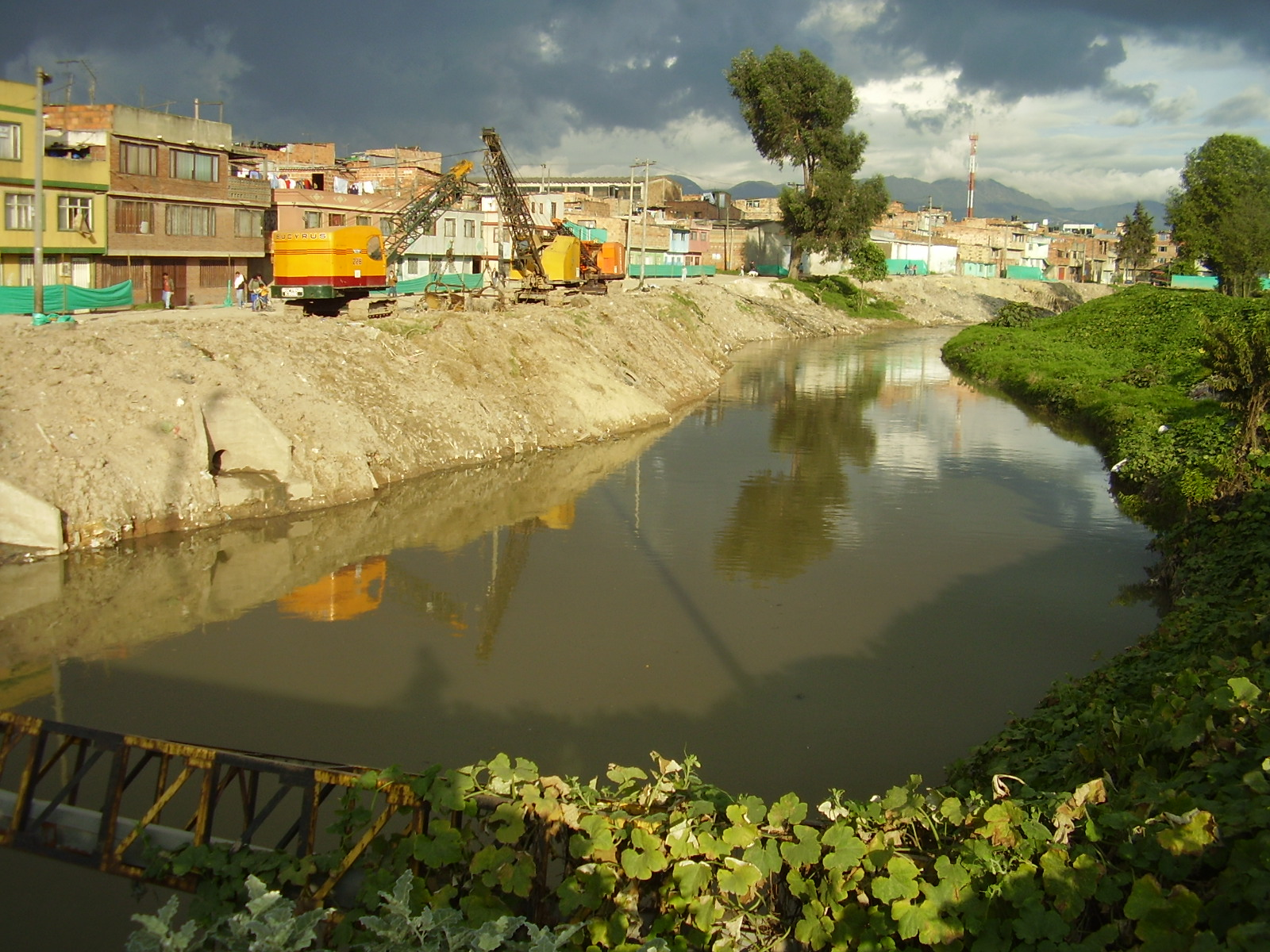

- Location of the Tunjuelo River in Colombia
- Etymology: Muysccubun: "cerro de los tunjos"
- Native name: Río Tunjuelo (Spanish); Río Tunjuelito (Spanish)

Location
- Country: Colombia
- Department: Cundinamarca
- Municipalities: Bogotá
- Localities: Sumapaz; Usme; Ciudad Bolívar; Tunjuelito; Kennedy; Bosa

Physical characteristics
- Source: Sumapaz Páramo
  - coordinates: 4°18′25″N 74°07′50″W
- Mouth: Bogotá River
  - coordinates: 4°37′45″N 74°13′21″W
- Length: 73 km (45 mi)

Basin features
- River system: Bogotá River; Magdalena Basin; Caribbean Sea

The Tunjuelo or Tunjuelito River is a river on the Bogotá savanna and a left tributary of the Bogotá River. The river, with a length of 73 kilometres (45 mi) originates in the Sumapaz Páramo and flows northward through the Usme Synclinal to enter the Colombian capital Bogotá. There, the river is mostly canalised flowing westward into the Bogotá River. It is one of the three main rivers of the city, together with the Fucha and Juan Amarillo Rivers.

== Etymology ==
The names Tunjuelo and Tunjuelito ("little Tunjuelo") are derived from the Cerro de los Tunjos, also Los Tunjos Lake, named after the tunjos, the religious votive figurines of the indigenous language of the Muisca, who inhabited the Bogotá savanna before the Spanish conquest.

== Description ==
Source and mouth of the Tunjuelo River on the Bogotá savanna

The Tunjuelo River has a total length of 73 kilometres (45 mi) and originates in the Sumapaz Páramo, in the southern part of Bogotá. It flows through the southern part of the Colombian capital, south of the Fucha River, and has the largest drainage basin of the rivers of Bogotá. The river flows through the Usme Synclinal, where the type localities of various geological formations (among others the Marichuela Formation) are situated. The Tunjuelo River forms the border between the localities Usme and Ciudad Bolivar and between the namesake locality Tunjuelito and Ciudad Bolívar. The Tunjuelo River is highly contaminated.

=== Geology ===
The Tunjuelo River valley hosts the type localities of various geologic formations of the Altiplano Cundiboyacense.

| Age | Formation | Lithologies | Notes |
|---|---|---|---|
| Pleistocene | Tunjuelo Formation | Conglomerates, sandstones, shales | |
| Early Pliocene | Marichuela Formation | Conglomerates | |
| Late Miocene | Marichuela Formation | Conglomerates | |
| Early Oligocene | Usme Formation | Shales, sandstones, conglomerates | |
| Late Eocene | Usme Formation | Shales, sandstones, conglomerates | |
| Late Eocene | Regadera Formation | Sandstones, conglomerates, shales | |
| Early Eocene | Regadera Formation | Sandstones, conglomerates, shales | |
| Early Eocene | Bogotá Formation | Mudstones, shales, siltstones, sandstones | |
| Late Paleocene | Bogotá Formation | Mudstones, shales, siltstones, sandstones | |

=== Wetlands ===
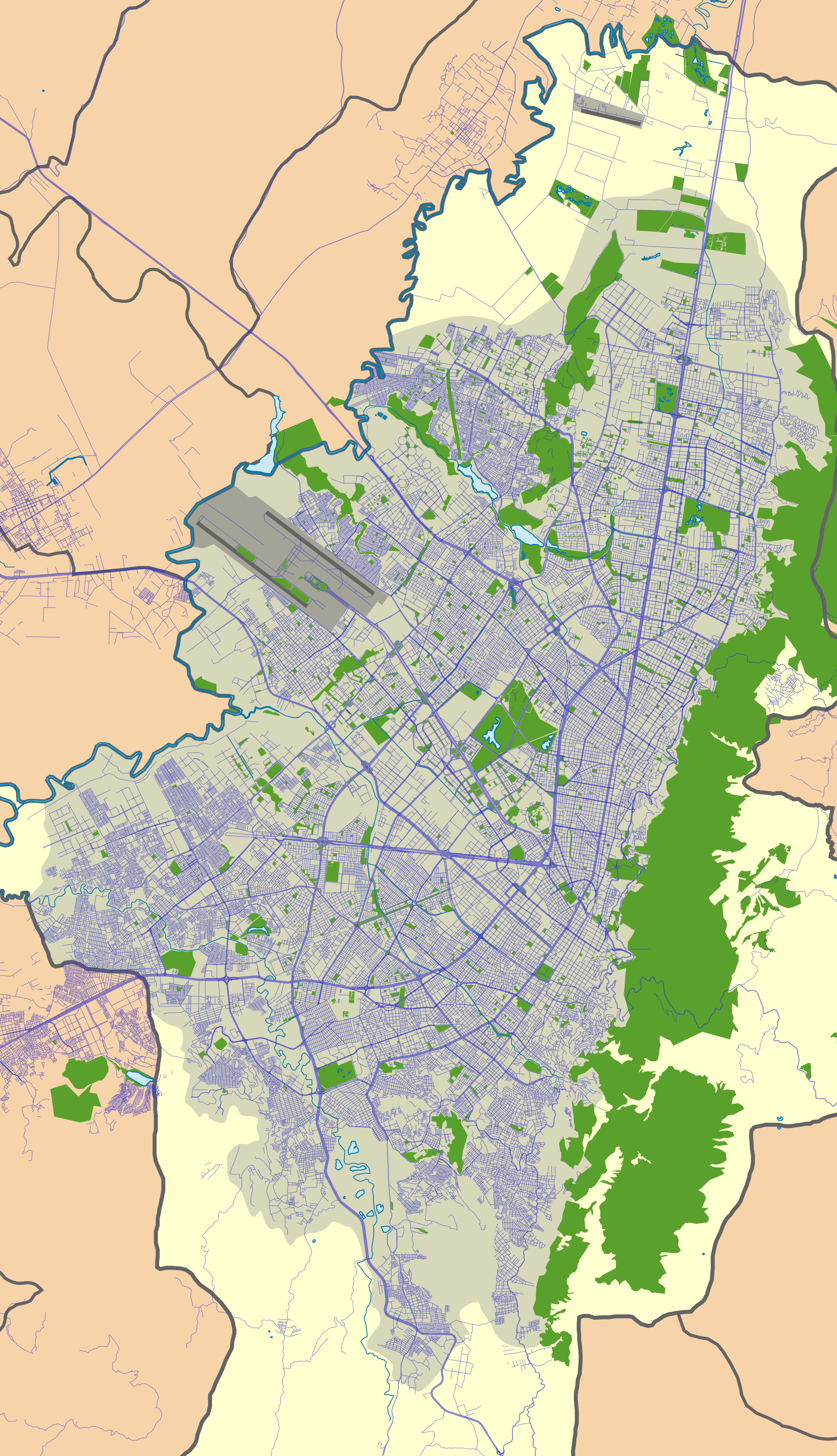
Wetlands in the Tunjuelo River basin

Three of the fifteen protected wetlands of Bogotá are located in the Tunjuelo River basin.

| Wetland | Location | Altitude (m) | Area (ha) | Notes |
|---|---|---|---|---|
| La Vaca | Kennedy | 2548 | 7.96 | |
| La Isla | Bosa | 2550 | 7.7 | |
| Tibanica | Bosa; Soacha | 2542 | 28.8 | |

== Gallery ==
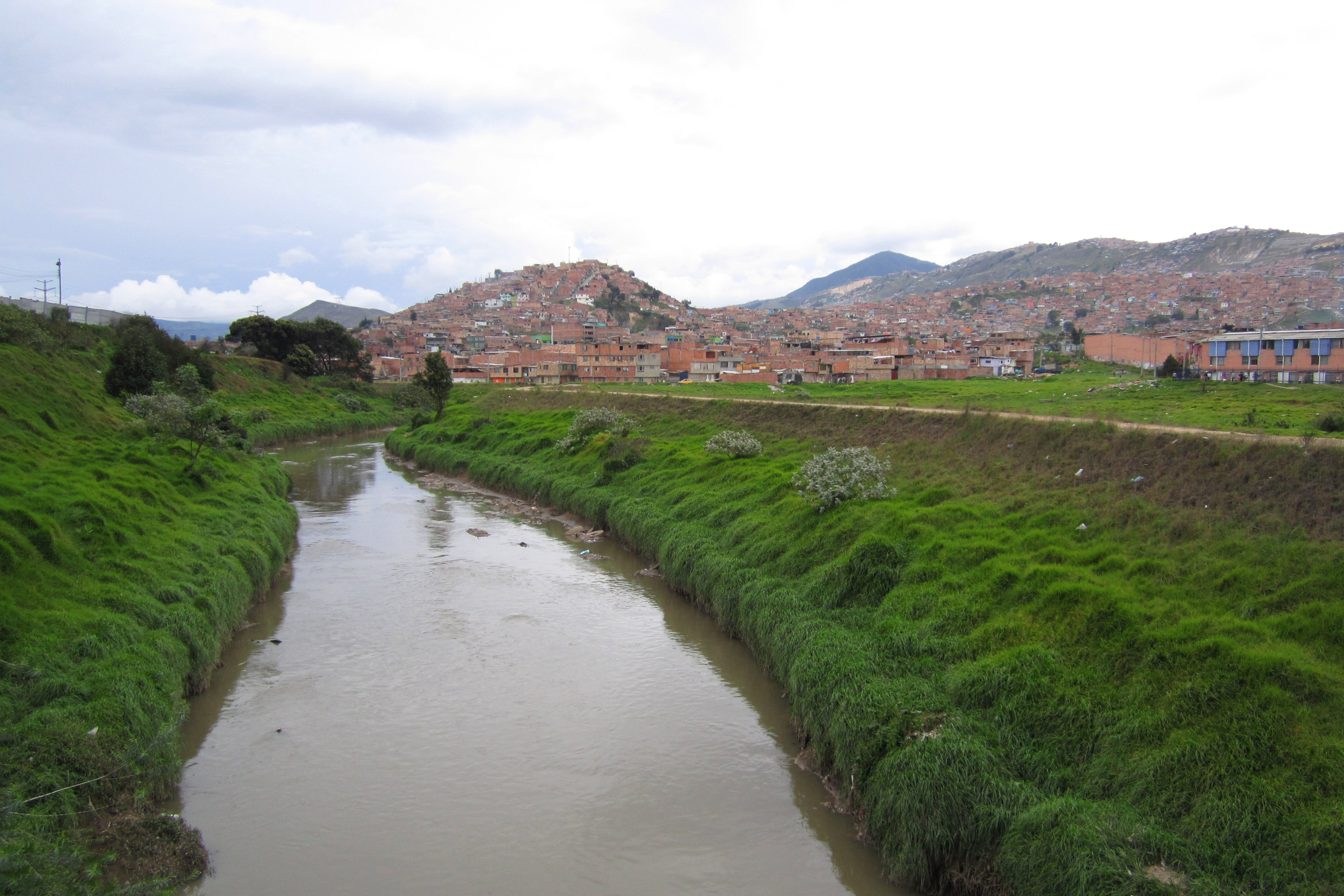
Tunjuelo River in Ciudad Bolívar

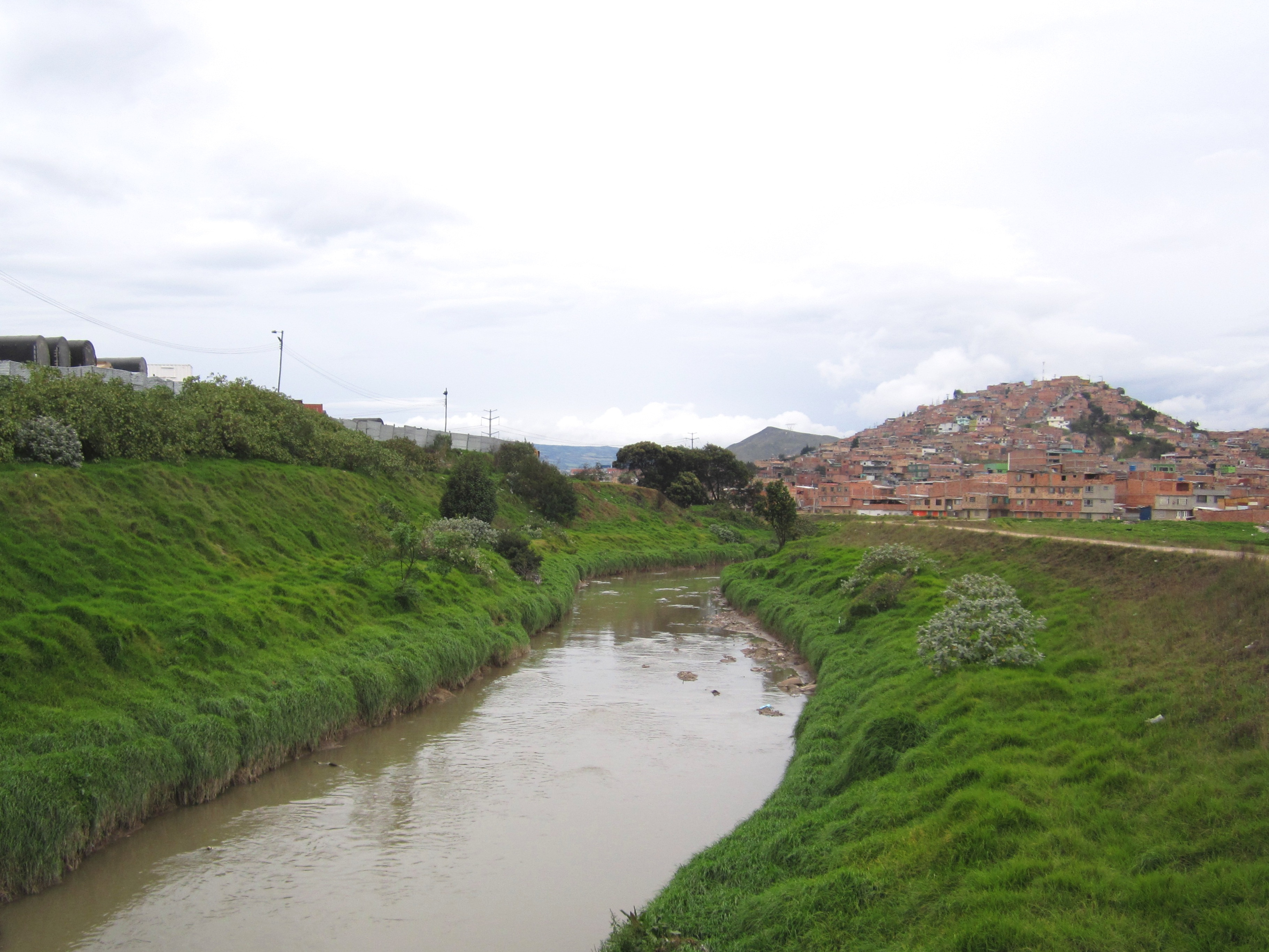
Tunjuelo River

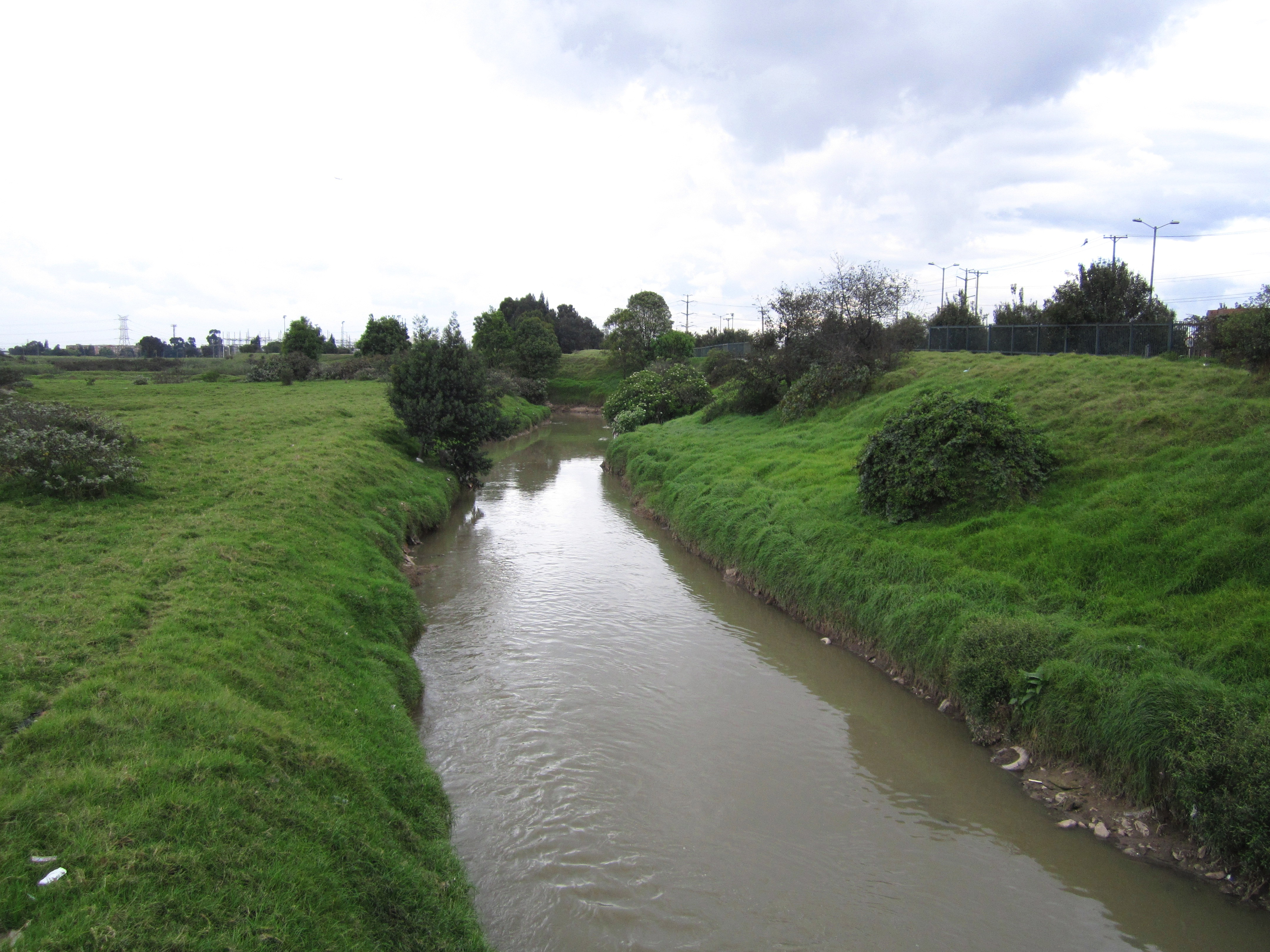
Tunjuelo River

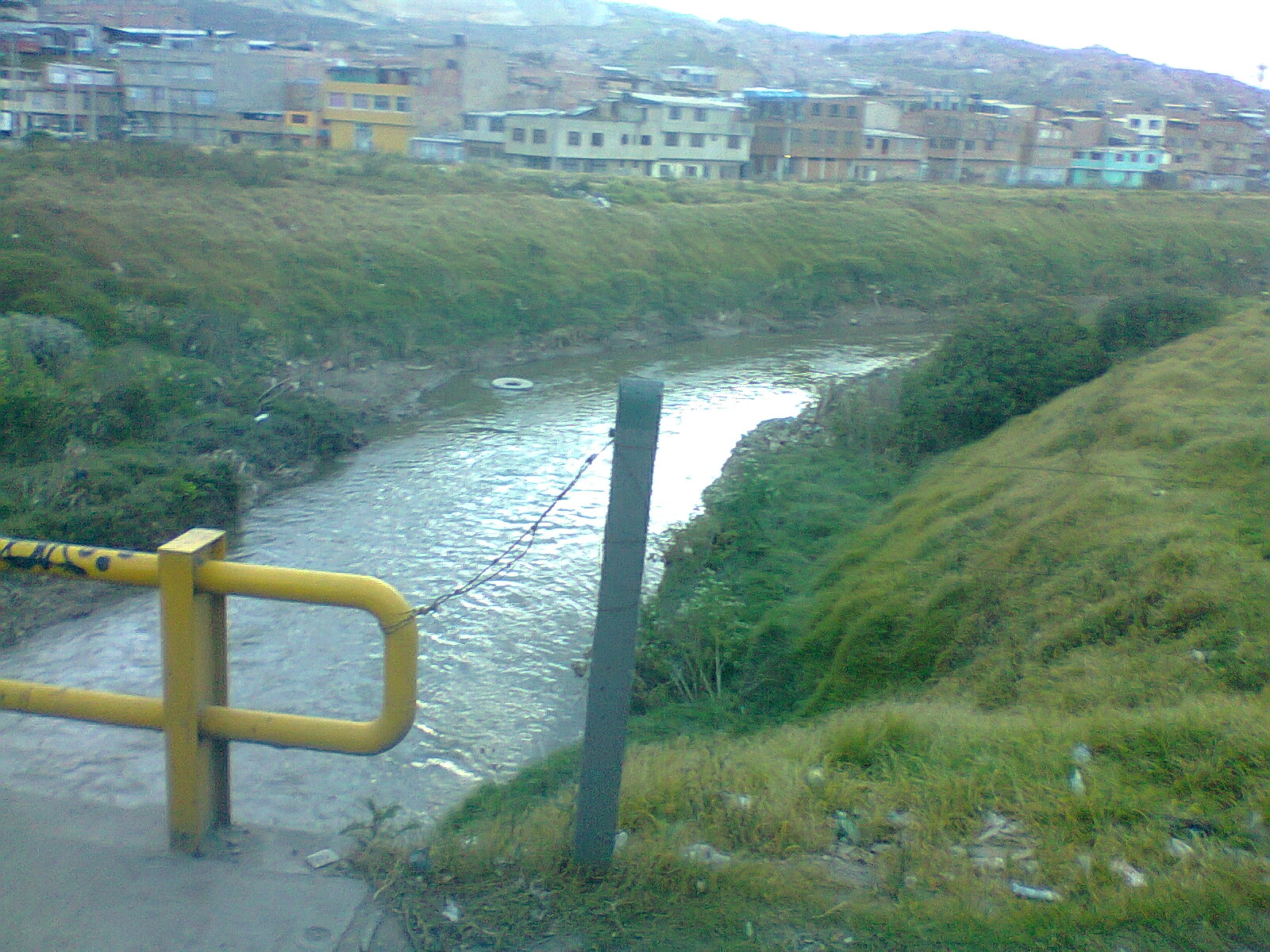
Tunjuelo River in Tunjuelito

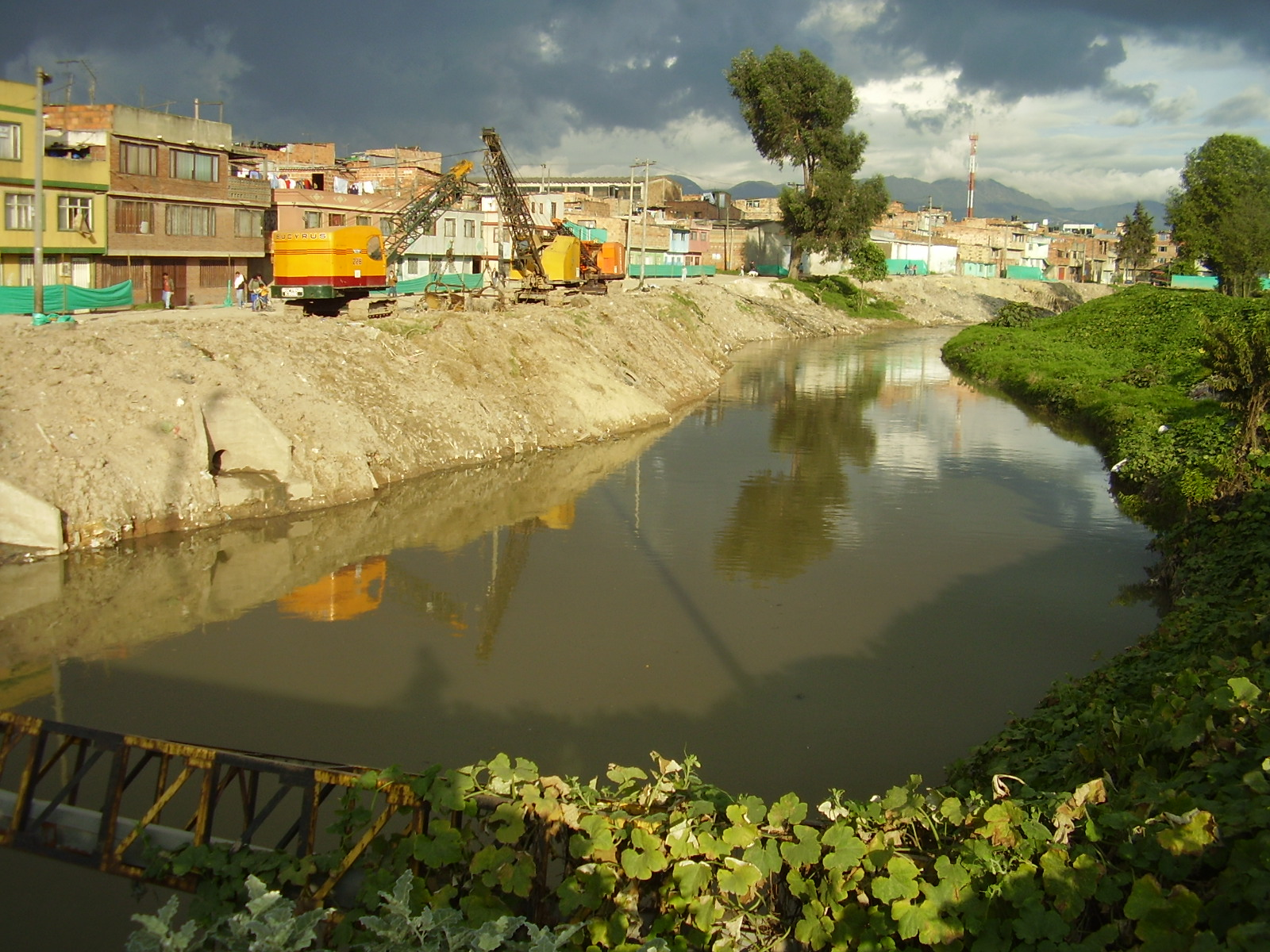
Canalised part of the river

== See also ==
- List of rivers of Colombia
- Eastern Hills, Bogotá
- Bogotá savanna, Sumapaz Páramo
- Fucha River, Juan Amarillo River
