= Bosa, Bogotá =

Bosa
- Locality of Bogotá
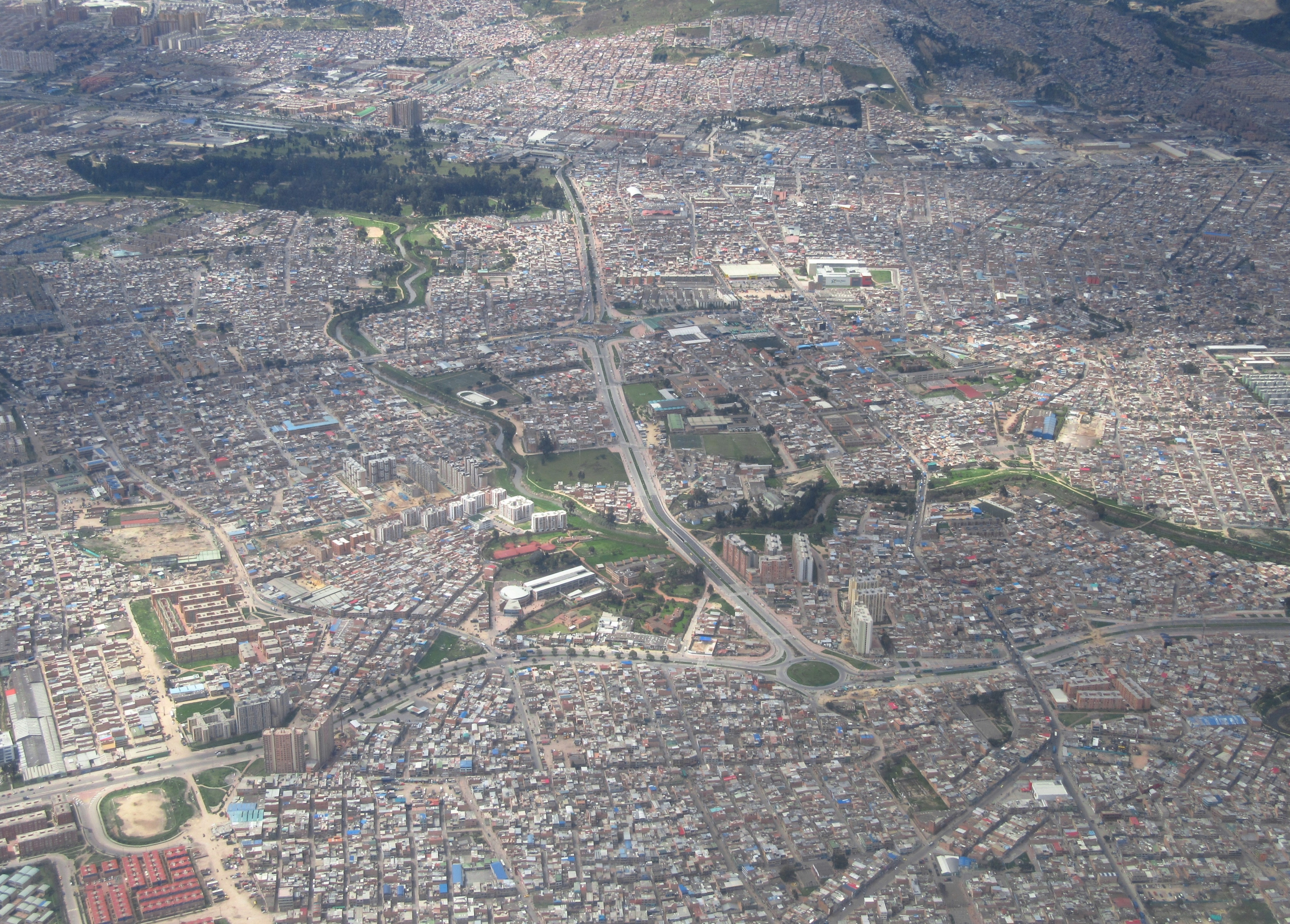
- Bird's eye view of Bosa

- Flag Coat of arms

- Location of the locality in the city of Bogotá

- Location of the locality in the Capital District of Bogotá
- Coordinates: 4°37′01″N 74°11′24″W
- Country: Colombia
- City: Bogotá D.C.

Area
  - Total: 23.93 km^{2} (9.24 sq mi)
- Elevation: 2,600 m (8,500 ft)

Population (2007)
  - Total: 546,809
  - Density: 22,850/km^{2} (59,180/sq mi)
- Time zone: UTC-5 (Colombia Standard Time)
- Website: Official website

Bosa is the 7th locality of the Capital District of the Colombian capital, Bogotá. Bosa is located in the southwest of Bogotá and is the 8th largest locality and 9th most populated. This district is inhabited by working-class residents.

== Etymology ==
The name of Bosa in Muysccubun means "enclosure of the one that guards and defends the cornfields".

== Geography ==
Bosa limits to the north with the Tunjuelo River and the Camino de Osorio neighborhood of the locality Kennedy. To the south Bosa borders the Autopista Sur separating it from the localitity of Ciudad Bolívar and the municipality of Soacha in Cundinamarca. To the east, Bosa borders the Tunjuelo River and the locality of Kennedy and to the west the Bogotá River and the municipalities of Soacha and Mosquera.

Besides being crossed by the Tunjuelo and Bogotá River, Bosa also has numerous creeks and streams which include the Quebrada Limas, Quebrada Trompeta, La Estrella, El Infierno, Quiba, Calderón, Bebedero and Aguas Calientes.

== History ==
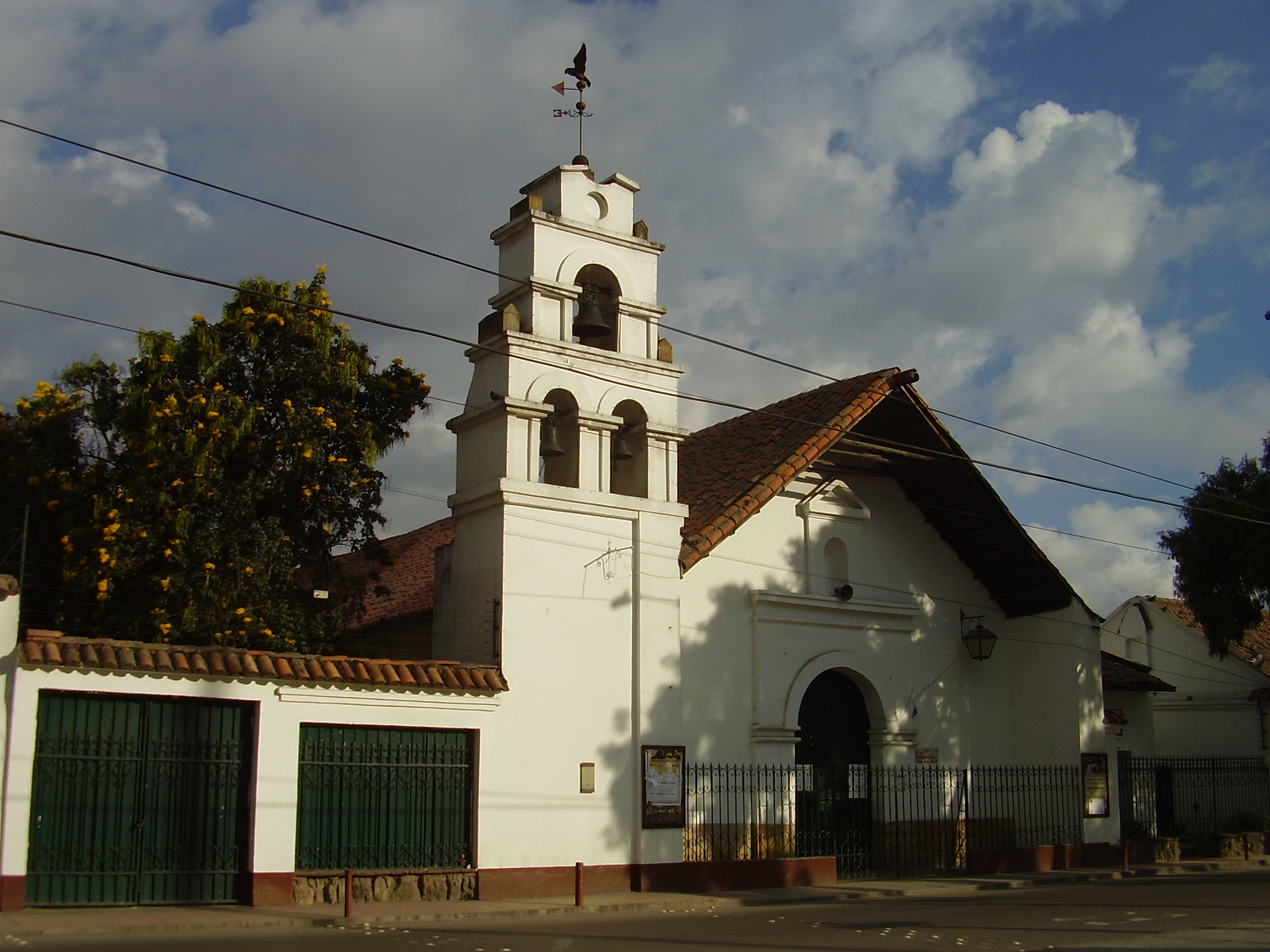
Church of San Bernardino, in the central park of Bosa. It is said that the façade was built in 1538 by Gonzalo Jiménez de Quesada, Nicolás de Federman and Sebastián de Belalcázar

Bosa was once the site of an important Muisca village. During the Pre-Columbian era, the area was governed by caciques as part of the Muisca Confederation, among them and at the moment of the Spanish arrival; the cacique Techovita.

Early in 1538, Bosa witnessed one of the most dramatic chapters in the history of the Muisca. The last zipa, Sagipa (also called Saquesazipa among other names), was hung by Gonzalo Jiménez de Quesada when his subjects failed to fill up a room with the amount of gold the conquistadors asked as ransom for his freedom. At the same time, Cuxinimpaba and Cuxinimegua, or Cuxininegua, the legitimate heirs to the throne of Tisquesusa, the last independent Muisca ruler who had been assassinated in Funza in 1537 by Jiménez de Quesada's soldiers, were hanged. This way the conquistador put an end to the lineage of the Muisca rulers.

In 1538, Bosa became a meeting place for Gonzalo Jiménez de Quesada, Nikolaus Federmann and Sebastián de Belalcázar during the Spanish conquest of the Muisca. The exact location of their encounter was marked with a stone cross, today located on the east side of Bosa's main square.

The 4th article of the June 22, 1850 Law dissolved the resguardo for indigenous people, in an effort to drive them away from the villages. These process ended in 1886.

On November 22, 1853, a battle took place in Bosa between the forces of Tomás Cipriano de Mosquera, José Hilario López and Pedro Alcántara Herrán against the forces of Dictator Jose Maria Melo, this became known as the Battle of Bosa.

Until the mid 20th century, Bosa was a relatively small municipality formed by five neighborhoods and a population less than 20,000 people. The people dedicated to rural agricultural activities. By 1954, the government of Gustavo Rojas Pinilla annexed Bosa to the Special District of Bogotá, which triggered a demographic expansion. Bosa then became a commuter town for Bogotá.

In the Colombian Constitution of 1991, Bogotá was rearranged and became the Capital District in which Bosa formed the 7th locality. In 1992 and 2000, the Cabildos of Suba and Bosa were officially recognized by the Government of Bogotá as stipulated in Law 89 of 1890. The Cabildo Mayor del Pueblo Muisca was founded on September 22, 2002 in Bosa.

== Sites of interest ==
- San Bernardino Church, the construction of this church began in 1618 and was declared a National Monument by the Colombian government. In front of it a stone cross marks the exact place where the three conquistadors met.
- El Humilladero Hermitage
- Francisco de Paula Santander School. It is a school located in next to the Town hall of Bosa, is recognized as the first school of Bosa, its creation and inauguration was in 1938 as a rural school, now "La Casona" is a cultural heritage being a structure on the verge of collapse, but it is composed of other buildings where classes are taught for all grades. Currently has the classroom RTC (Reinvent The Classroom), which is a classroom of education 3.0, first classroom in Colombia and Latin America.

== Neighborhoods and veredas ==
=== Neighborhoods ===
- Among the most important neighborhoods are : La Libertad, Palestina, Bosa Brasil, Bosa La Independencia, Piamonte, Jiménez De Quesada, Despensa, Laureles, La Estación, José Antonio Galán, La Azucena, La Amistad, El Motorista, Antonia Santos, Naranjos, Olarte, El Corzo and downtown Bosa.

=== Veredas ===
The San Bernardino vereda is inhabited by direct descendants of the Muisca who used as last name the name of the tribe, such as Neuta, Chiguasque, Tunjo, Orobajo and Fitatá.

== Transport ==
Locally, Bosa has very few access points due to the presence of large slums which do not have paved roads besides Avenida Bosa. Public transportation from other parts of Bogotá arrives through the Avenida Ciudad de Cali and the Avenida Primero de Mayo and the Diagonal 86. Bosa is served by two main TransMilenio stations; Portal del Sur (line G) and Portal de Las Américas (line F) and their support routes.
