= Ciudad Bolívar, Bogotá =

Ciudad Bolívar
- Locality of Bogotá
- Location of the locality in the city of Bogotá

- Location of the locality in the Capital District of Bogotá
- Coordinates: 4°32′10″N 74°08′20″W
- Country: Colombia
- City: Bogotá D.C.
- Neighbourhoods: List: Madelena

Area
  - Total: 130 km^{2} (50 sq mi)
- Elevation: 2,600 m (8,500 ft)

Population (2007)
  - Total: 593,937
  - Density: 4,600/km^{2} (12,000/sq mi)
- Time zone: UTC-5 (Colombia Standard Time)
- Website: Official website

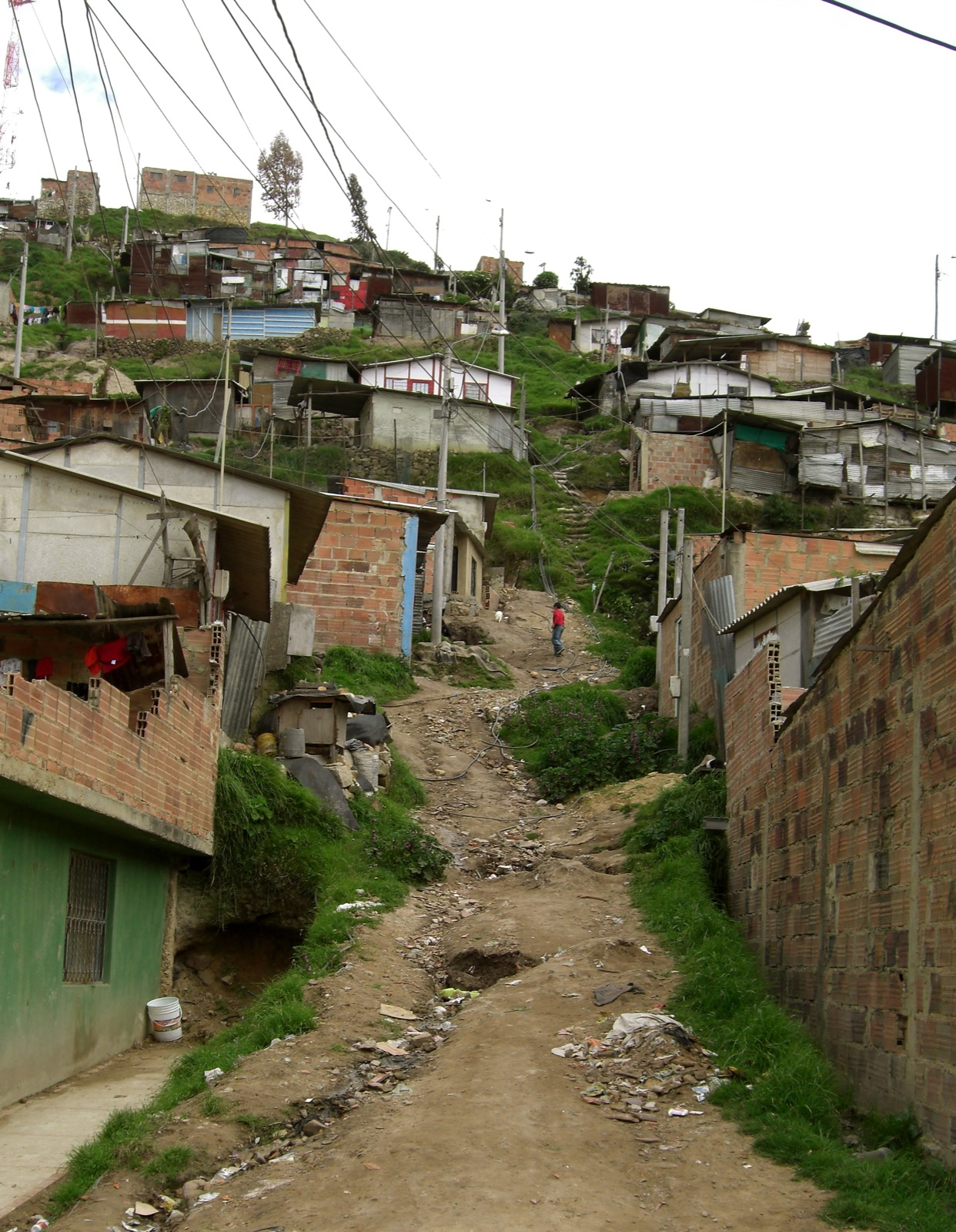
Ciudad Bolívar

Ciudad Bolívar is the 19th locality in the Capital District of the Colombian capital city Bogotá. Ciudad Bolívar is located in the south of the city at the southern border of the Bogotá savanna. This district is mostly inhabited by under privileged residents.

While most Ciudad Bolívar's area is rural, its urban portion includes one of the world's largest mega-slums. Its urban area concentrates the poorest population in Bogotá and is known for its rampant levels of violence due to a large activity of gangs, mafia, and at times FARC, the national ex-terrorist group of Colombia.

== Geography ==
The locality of Ciudad Bolívar is 90% mountainous and has a total area of 229.14 square kilometres (88.47 sq mi), of which 20.88 square kilometres (8.06 sq mi) is urban, making it the 7th largest locality of Bogota. The locality is located in the southwestern part of the urban area of Bogota, bordering to the north with the locality of Bosa, Kennedy and Tunjuelito by the Tunjuelito River and the Autopista Sur. To the west, it borders the municipalities of Soacha, Sibaté and Pasca, to the south borders with the locality of Sumapaz, to the east with the localities of Tunjuelito and Usme.

=== Transport ===
There are very few neighborhoods with access to main roads besides the Avenida Ciudad de Villavicencio which crosses the locality from north to east in a diagonal sense. The Avenida Boyacá is the main road for the neighborhoods located on the eastern side of the locality and the Avenida Jorge Gaitán Cortés which serves the neighborhoods of the southeastern part.

The mass transit system TransMilenio covers Ciudad Bolívar in some areas with stops over the Caracas Avenue in Perdomo and Centro Comercial Paseo Villa del Río - Madelena. TransMiCable gondola lift opened in 2018 and serves the steep hill neighbourhoods of Ciudad Bolívar.

== History ==
During the 1950s, the area was formed by haciendas which were fractioned as a process of urbanization due to its proximity to the exploding Bogotá's urban development. The first neighborhoods were Meissen, San Francisco, Buenos Aires, Lucero Bajo and La María which were populated by low income people; mainly immigrants from the neighboring Departments of Tolima, Boyacá. The rapid population growth in the area reached in the 1970s some 50,000 inhabitants.

A second urbanization stage started in the 1980s with settlements on the higher parts of the southern hills with neighborhoods as Naciones Unidas, Cordillera, Alpes, Juan José Rondón, Juan Pablo II and others. The Inter-American Development Bank also helped to develop the neighborhoods of Sierra Morena, Arborizadora Alta and Baja for low-income families which in less than 20 years generated areas of concentration.

Since 1983 the Council of Bogotá designed the Ciudad Bolívar Plan which was designed to plan the area's development. On September 14, 1983, the Minor City hall of Ciudad Bolívar was created.

With the Colombian Constitution of 1991 Bogotá's Special District was changed to a Capital District and Ciudad Bolívar became a locality with its own Local City hall and Local Administrative Junta (Council) with 11 councilmen.

== Neighborhoods and veredas ==
=== Neighborhoods ===
Some of the better known neighborhoods are: La Estrella, El Paraíso, Lucero Alto, San Joaquín, Sierra Morena, San Francisco, Perdomo, Madelena, La Isla, Alto de La Cruz, Minuto de María and Francisco Pizarro.

=== Veredas ===
Some of the veredas located in Ciudad Bolívar are El Mochuelo, located near the Doña Juana landfill and Pasquilla.

== Paleontology ==
In 1987, fossil remains of Etayoa bacatensis were found in Ciudad Bolívar.

== Born in Ciudad Bolívar ==
- Miguel Ángel Rubiano, professional cyclist
