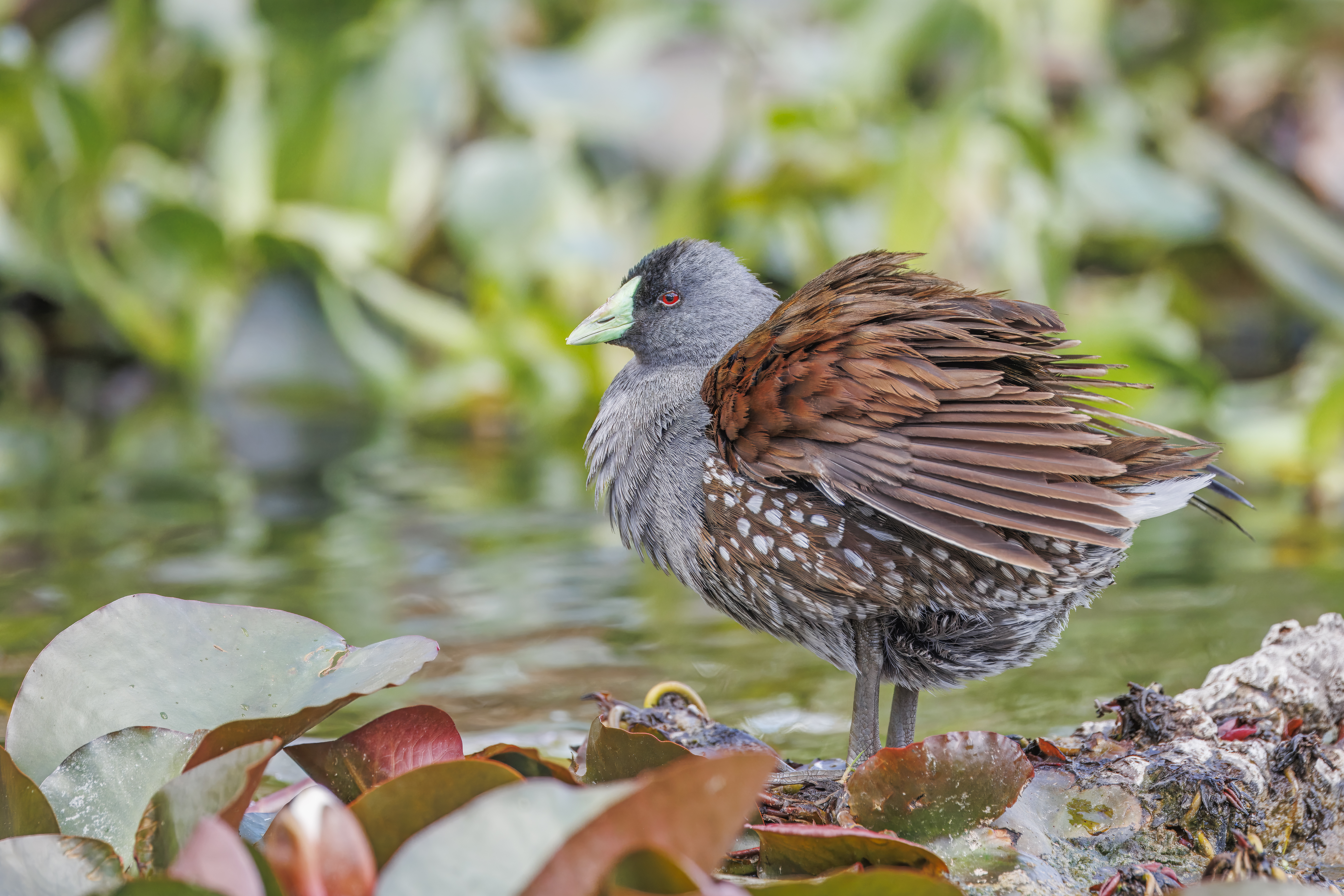
- P. m. crassirostris, Chile

Conservation status
- Least Concern (IUCN 3.1)

Scientific classification
- Kingdom: Animalia
- Phylum: Chordata
- Class: Aves
- Order: Gruiformes
- Family: Rallidae
- Genus: Porphyriops; Pucheran, 1845
- Species: P. melanops

Binomial name
- Porphyriops melanops (Vieillot, 1819)

Synonyms
- Gallinula melanops

= Spot-flanked gallinule =

Species of bird

The spot-flanked gallinule (Porphyriops melanops) is a species of bird in the family Rallidae. It is monotypic in the genus Porphyriops. It is found in Argentina, Bolivia, Brazil, Chile, Colombia, Paraguay, Peru, and Uruguay. Its natural habitats are swamps and freshwater lakes, but it is able to survive in properly managed artificial ponds. Its population has declined significantly in recent decades.

The spot-flanked gallinule has a W chromosome that is larger than its Z chromosome, which is unique among bird species.

== Description ==
The spot-flanked gallinule weighs between 154 and 225 grams, with an average length of 28 cm, often described as a small waterfowl-like bird. Its head, chin, neck and breast feathers are a slate gray, contrasting with the black forehead and crown, extending to the top of the nape. Its covert feathers are a brown, cocoa-like, color while primary feathers tend to have a slight color contrast and are a darker shade of brown. As the name suggests, the flanks of this species is brown with white mottling with its rump a mix of the same shades of brown and white. Juveniles do not have any contrasting plumage and are typically entirely black before developing brown feathers followed by the other distinctive mature features. Most noticeably, the spot-flanked gallinule is often called the Green-Billed Tingua in Spanish due to its pale green beak which develops as it ages from a black and pink juvenile beak. Its legs are a drab green-gray color and are rarely visible as it spends a majority of its time in the water. Its iris changes from black as juvenile, to different shades of brown to its eventual, mature, vibrant red color.

== Taxonomy ==
Order Gruiformes is one of the many taxonomic classifications that possess very little chromosomal information; of its 189 species, only 30 have had their chromosomes studied.

The spot-flanked gallinule is currently, and commonly, classified as a member of the family Rallidae, genus Porphyriops, however, it possesses a unique set of chromosomes, making it different from other Rallidae members with a W chromosome that is larger than its Z chromosome. Previous research dictated that this difference meant it belonged in genus Porphyrio but recent research on chromosomal data has shown very few similarities to P. porphyrio and instead, closely related to Gallinula chloropus, describing the spot-flanked gallinule into genus Gallinula. Its binomial nomenclature remains as Porphyriops melanops until further research is made.

The spot-flanked gallinule currently has three confirmed subspecies, two of which are often referred to as P. melanops as they inhabit connected territories across South America while the third subspecies is isolated in small populations within Colombia.

- Porphyriops melanops bogotensis (Colombia)
- Porphyriops melanops crassirostris (Argentina and Chile)
- Porphyriops melanops melanops (Brazil, Paraguay, Uruguay, Argentina)

P.m. crassirostrus gets its name from 'crassus', meaning thick or heavy, and 'rostris', meaning 'billed', its name translates to 'thick billed' to describe its thicker bill than the nominate P.m. melanops subspecies.

P.m. bogotensis is named after its population range being found within Bogotá, Colombia.

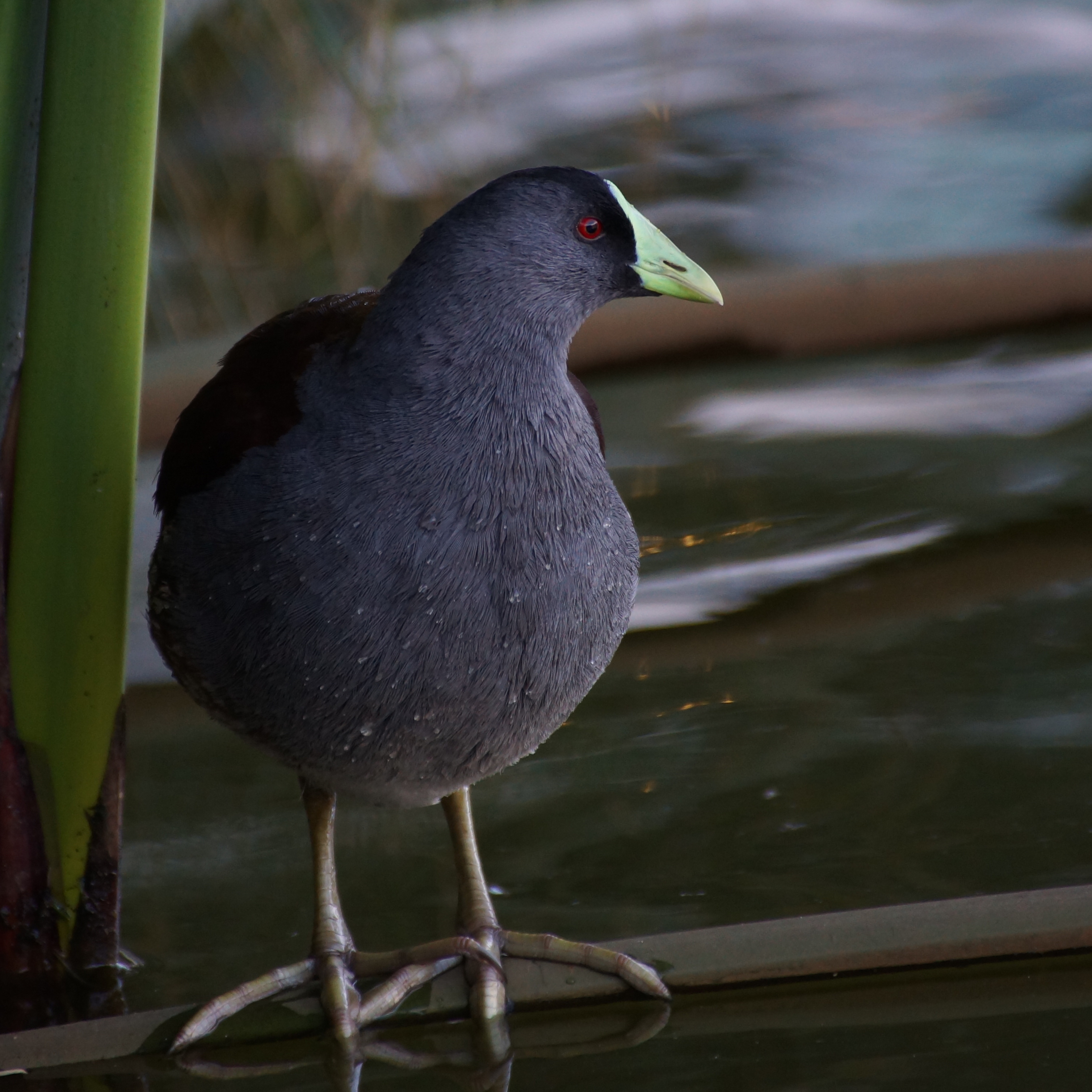
P. m. bogotensis, Colombia

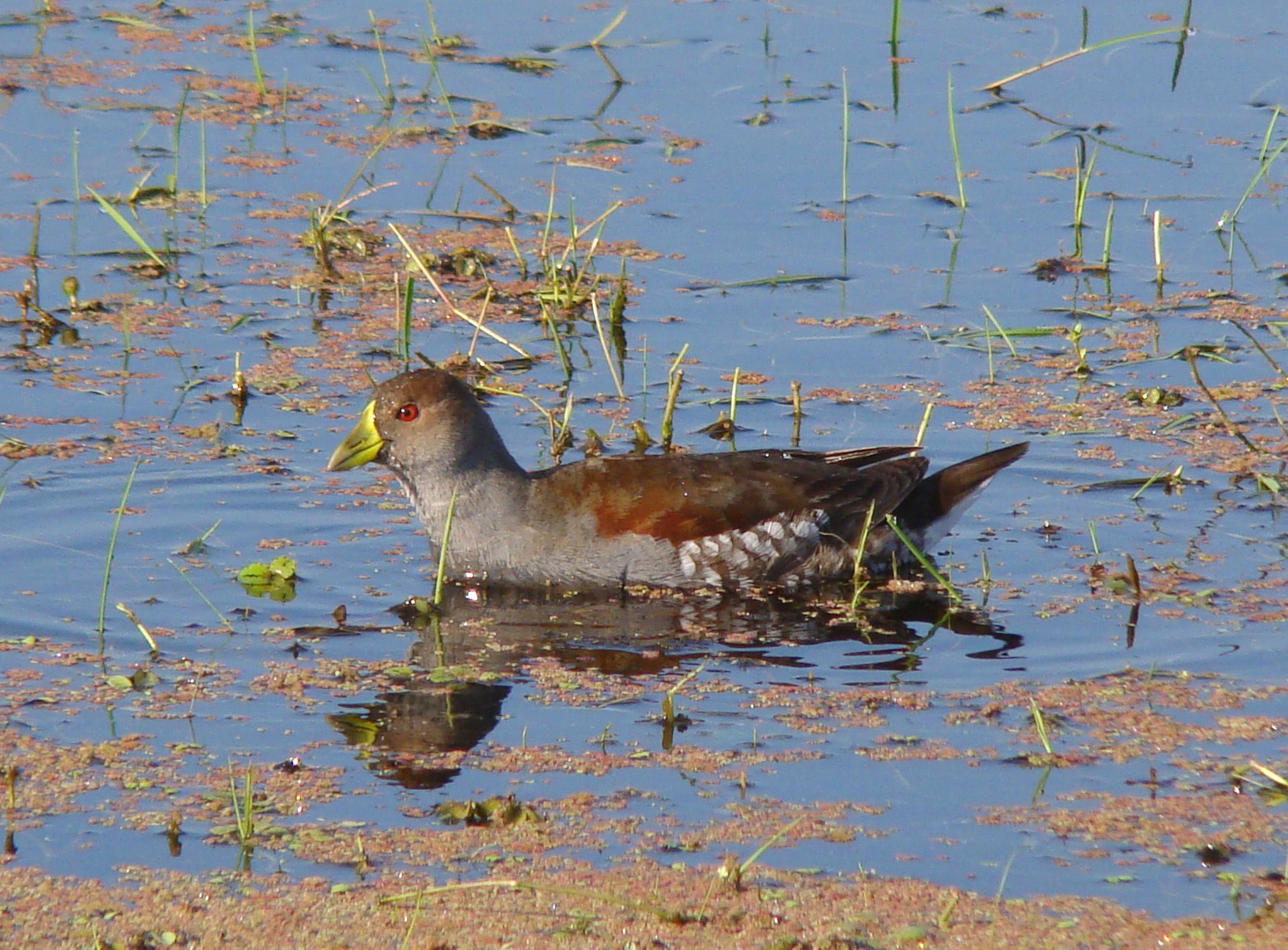
P. m. malanops, Brazil

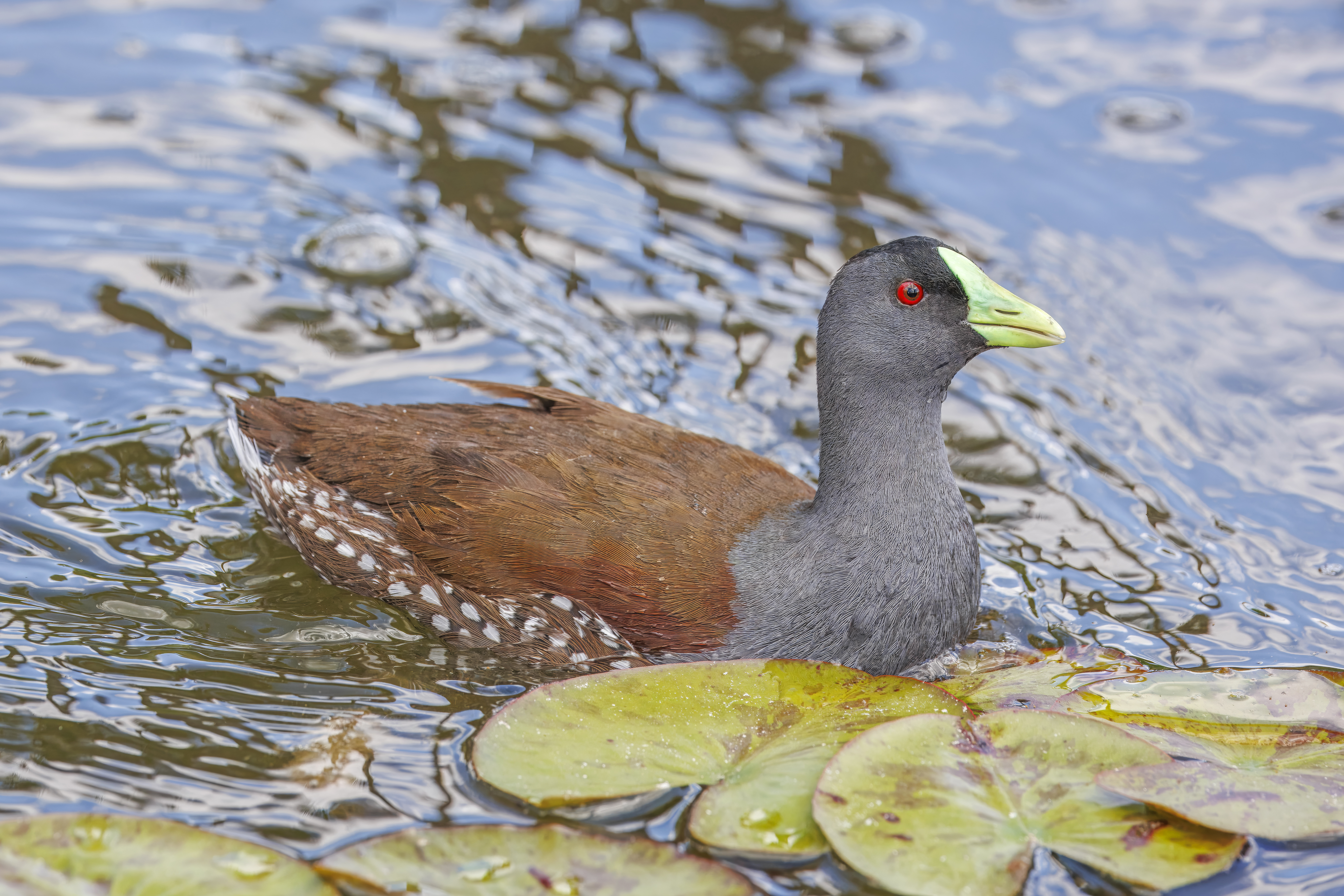
P. m. crassirostris, Chile

== Habitat and distribution ==
Preferred habitats included both natural and artificial zones, with a strong preference for ornamental lakes, artificial ponds and natural wetlands. P. melanops can also be found within microhabitats with emergent vegetation or grassy parks.

The spot-flanked gallinule has a general distribution across South America although larger populations can be found within Brazil, Argentina, Chile, Paraguay and Uruguay. Its more distinct subspecies, P. m. bogotensis, can be found within Colombia, isolated from the other P. melanops breeding populations.

== Behavior ==
=== Vocalizations ===
The spot-flanked gallinule can produce a variety of sounds at different pitches which often differs depending on locale, sounding as if it is cackling, making a ke-ke-ke-ke like sound. Its alternative call is quick clicking sound.

Its song includes the high pitched ke-ke-ke-ke cackling sound along with a low pitch whooping sound.

=== Diet ===
The spot-flanked gallinule has an omnivorous diet, it feeds on plants, such as Polygonum acuminatum and horsetail paspalum (Paspalum repens) due to their abundance within wetlands but has also been found to consume animals, specifically snails (family Planorbidae), and a small range of insects. They feed while swimming and often forage for food among floating or rooted aquatic vegetation. Some studies observed that the populations in Colombia had diets containing insects, snails and seeds, while feeding on completely different plant species than the other populations found in South America. These gallinules may also display a preference for certain food types depending on the availability of different food resources but favor Leptospermum laevigatum and sesame seeds.

=== Reproduction ===
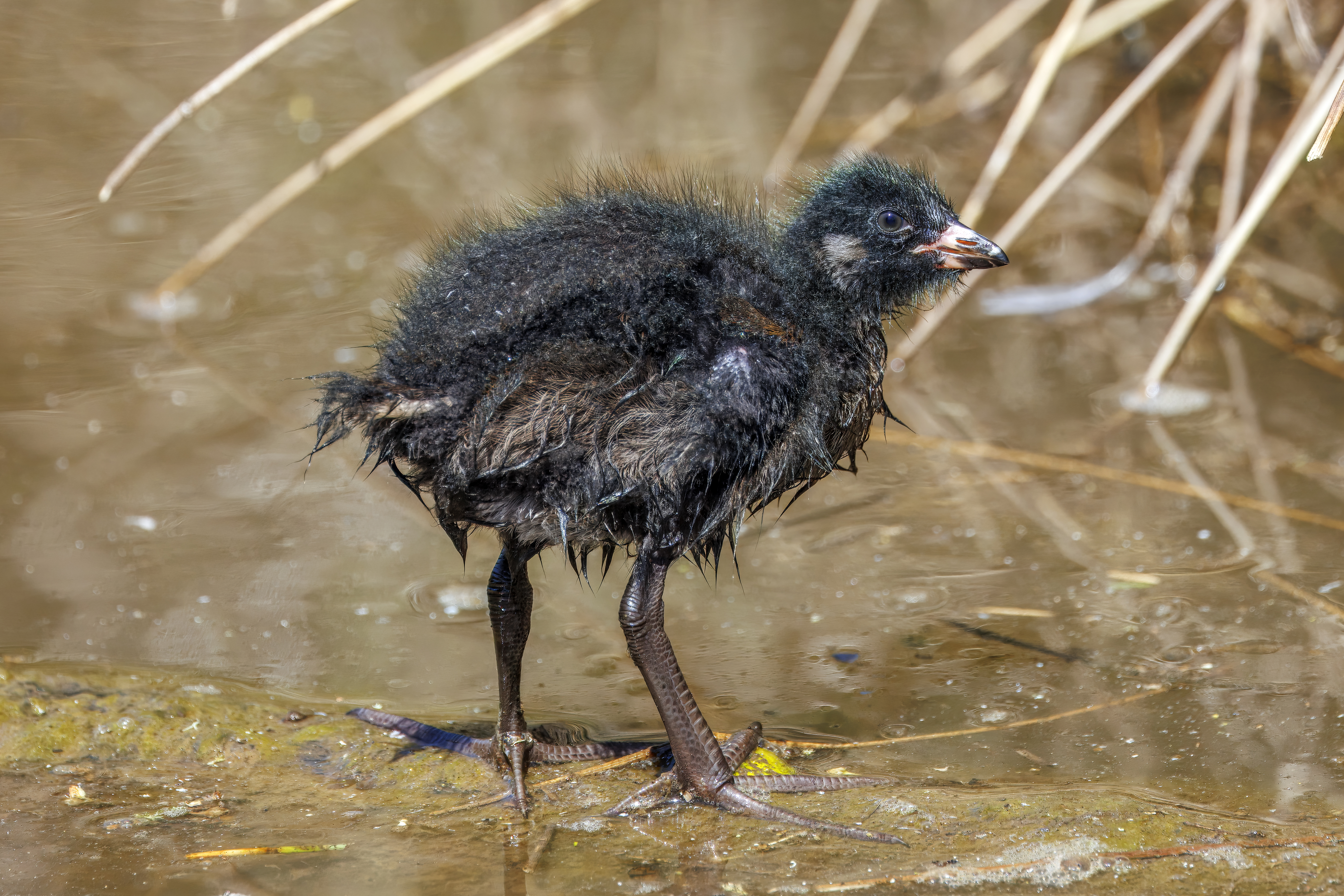
P. m. crassirostris

chick

Both males and females partake in the construction and caring of the nest, with only one breeding pair found per body of water. Nests are typically constructed using branches, fresh and dried leaves, and occasionally feathers. They are built in close proximity to the water's edge, or occasionally above the water; they are sheltered and hidden by the dense surrounding vegetation. Nests can support, on average, between three and six oval-shaped eggs which are cream-colored and flecked with dark brown mottling towards the bottom of the egg. Both parents incubate the eggs in shifts and will often call out to the current incubating parent that it was time to switch by emitting a cackling-like sound. The spot flanked gallinule parents will continue this routine for the 18–20 days it takes to incubate the eggs. The developed chicks will be fed and protected by the parents for the next 50 days but they have full swimming and diving capabilities within a few hours of hatching.
