= Bogotá River =

River in Colombia

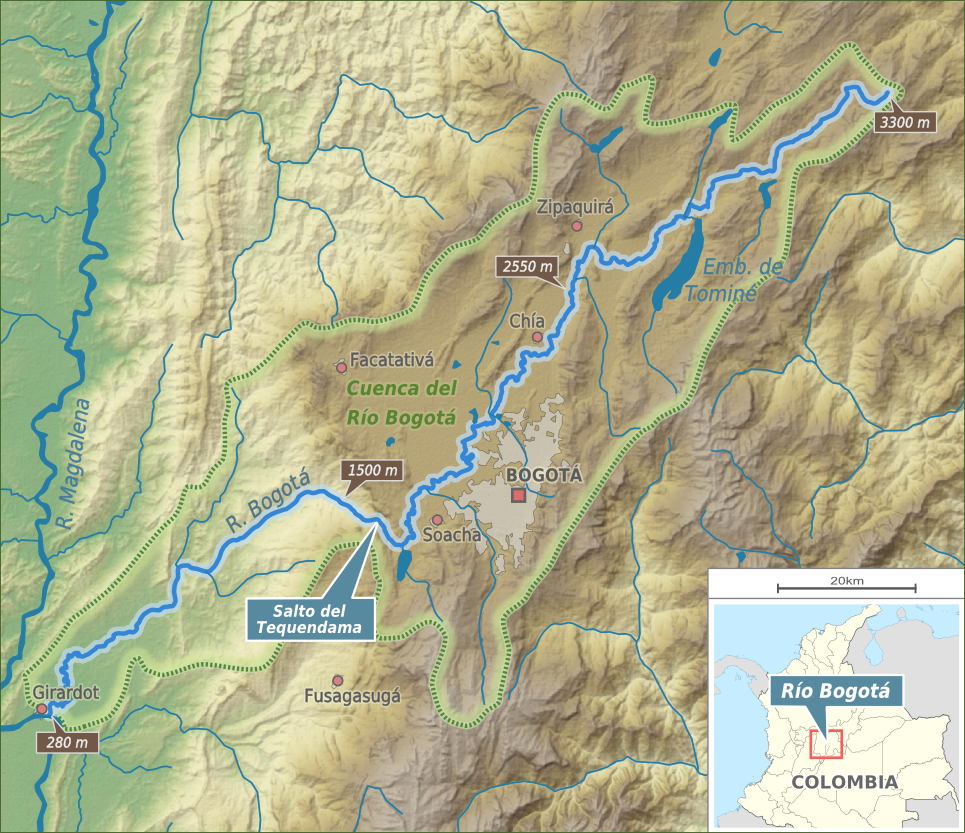
- Map of Bogotá River and its drainage basin
- Native name: Río Bogotá (Spanish)

Location
- Country: Colombia
- Department: Cundinamarca
- Provinces: Almeidas; Central Savanna; Western Savanna; Tequendama; Upper Magdalena

Physical characteristics
- Source: Guacheneque Páramo
  - location: Villapinzón
  - coordinates: 5°13′19.3″N 73°32′03.5″W
  - elevation: 3,300 m (10,800 ft)
- Mouth: Magdalena River
  - location: Girardot
  - coordinates: 4°17′19.2″N 74°47′47″W
- Length: 375 km (233 mi)
- Basin size: 6,000 km^{2} (2,300 sq mi)
- Discharge
  - average: 31–41 m^{3}/s (1,100–1,400 cu ft/s)

Basin features
- River system: Magdalena Basin; Caribbean Sea
- Tributaries
  - left: Teusacá; Torca; Juan Amarillo; Fucha; Tunjuelo; Soacha
  - right: Neusa; Río Frío; Bojacá; Subachoque; Apulo

The Bogotá River is a major river of the Cundinamarca department of Colombia. A right tributary of the Magdalena River, the Bogotá River crosses the region from the northeast to the southwest and passing along the western limits of Bogotá. The large population and major industrial base in its watershed have resulted in extremely severe pollution problems for the river.

== Etymology ==
The Bogotá River is named after Muyquytá, which is derived from Chibcha and means "(Enclosure) outside of the farm fields". In historical texts, and also nowadays in its upstream, the Bogotá River is also called Funza River.

== Course ==
Main tributaries of the Bogotá River are the Teusacá, Torca, Juan Amarillo, Fucha, Tunjuelo, Soacha (left) and Neusa, Río Frío, Bojacá and Subachoque Rivers (right).

Source and mouth of the Bogotá River and mouths of tributaries on and around the Bogotá savanna
N – Neusa River
Te – Teusacá River
RF – Río Frío
To – Torca River
JA – Juan Amarillo River
F – Fucha River
Tu – Tunjuelo River
B – Balsillas River ← Bojacá River + Subachoque River
S – Soacha River
A – Apulo River

The headwaters of the Bogotá River are in the municipality of Villapinzón, in the northeastern part of Cundinamarca near the limits with Boyacá. It has a course of about 150 kilometres (93 mi) as it crosses the Bogotá savanna, passing through Zipaquirá and eleven small municipalities, before reaching the city of Bogotá. As it runs along the western border of the city, the river forms the outlet for the heavily polluted Salitre, Fucha and Tunjuelito Rivers. After passing through the municipality of Soacha, the Bogotá River plunges off the savanna at the Tequendama Falls. It then follows a steep course, falling about 2,000 metres (6,600 ft) in 50 kilometres (31 mi), to join the Magdalena River at Girardot.

== Temperature ==
The temperature average ranges from 24 to 27 °C (75 to 81 °F).

== Gallery ==
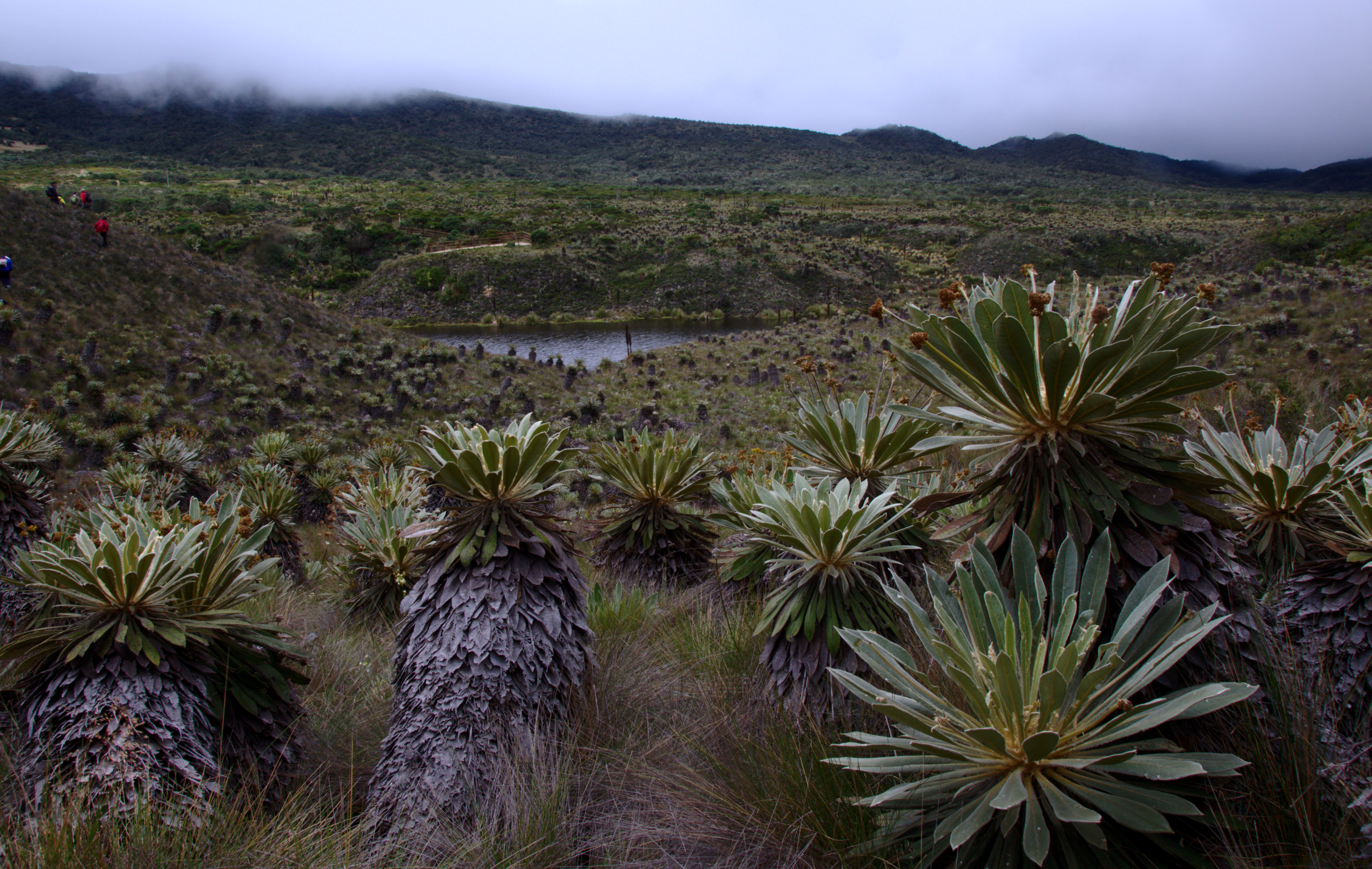
Birth of Funza or Bogotá River in Guacheneque Páramo (Villapinzón)

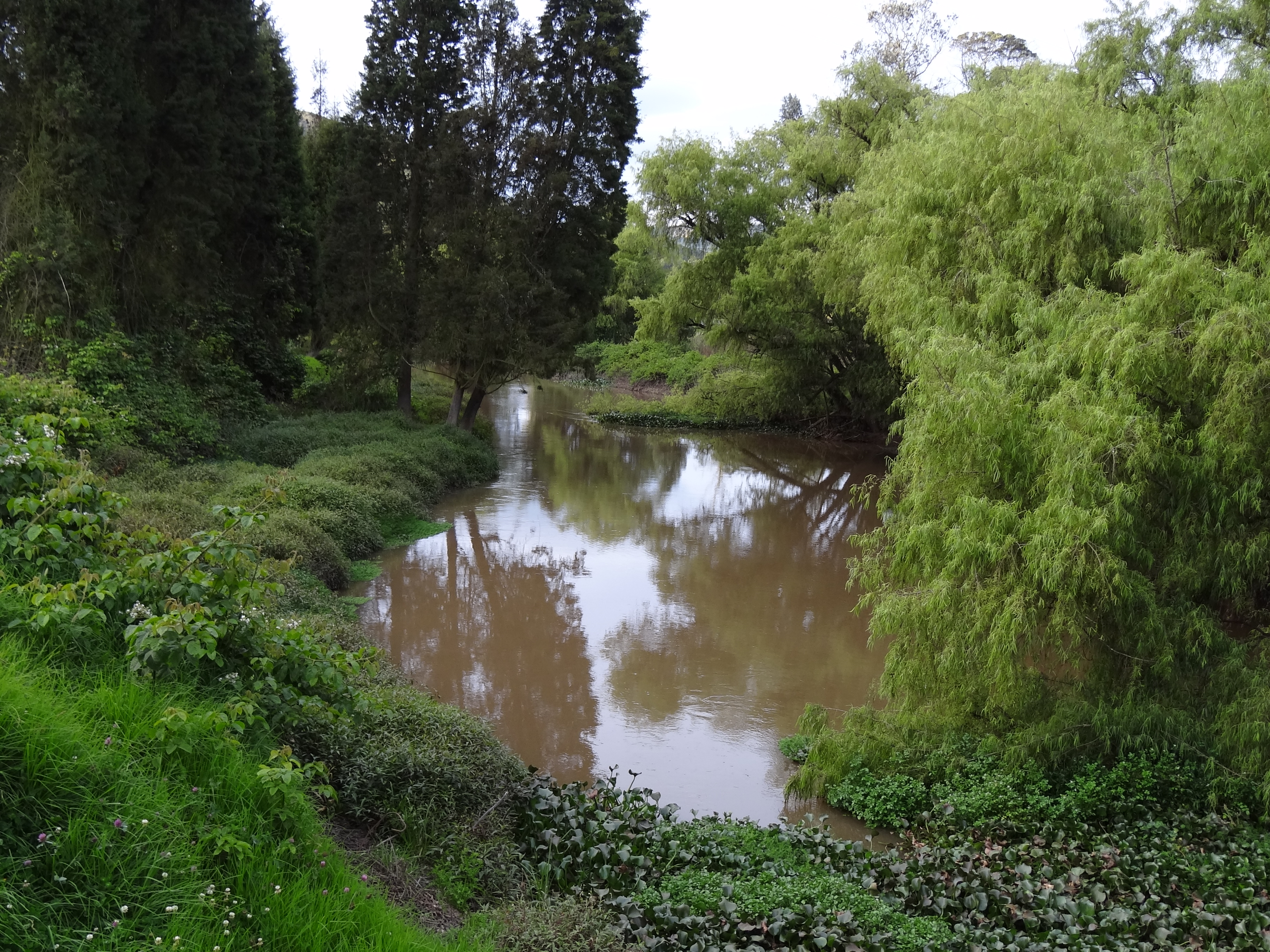
Bogotá River close to Zipaquirá

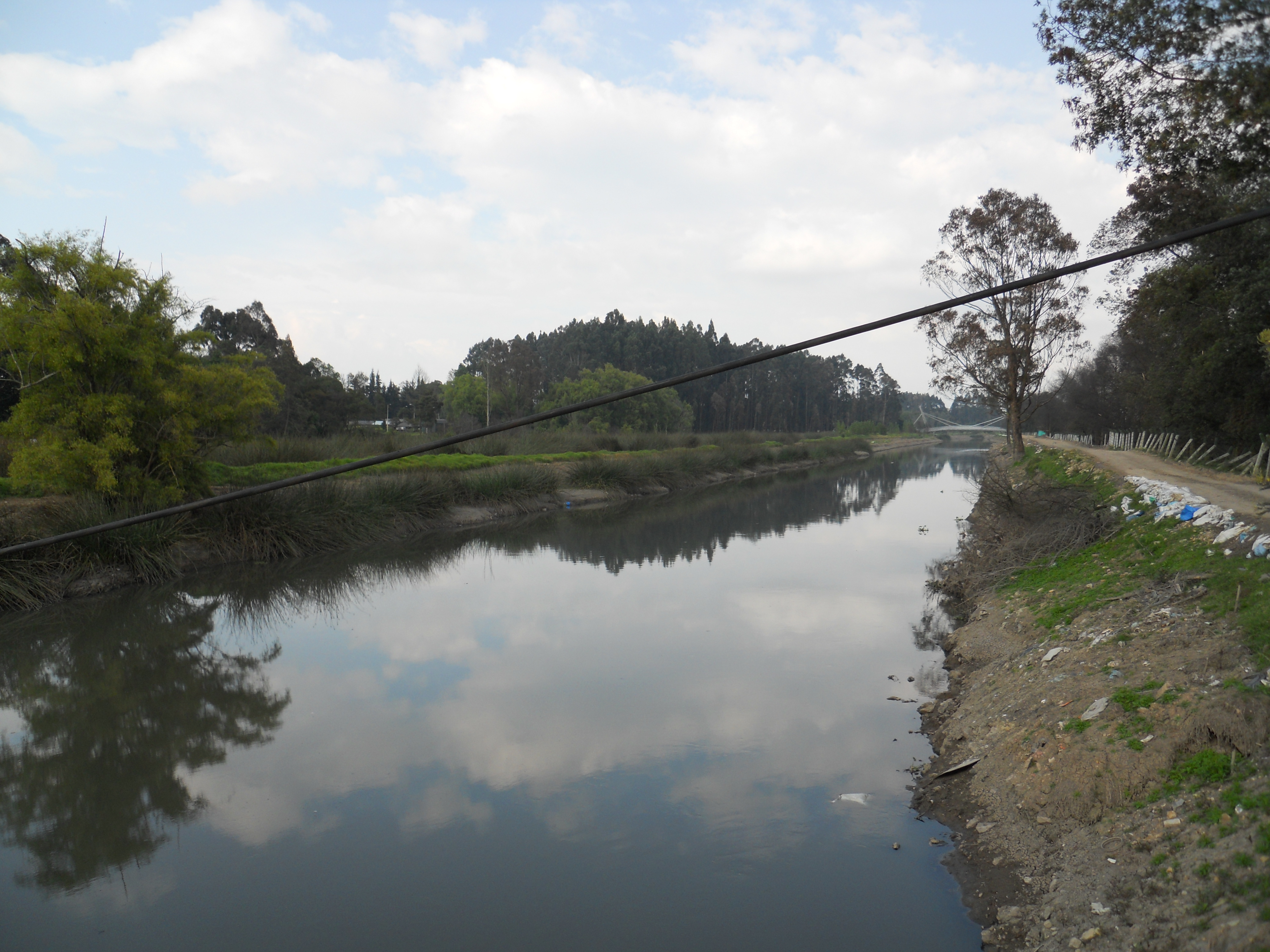
Bogotá River in Engativá

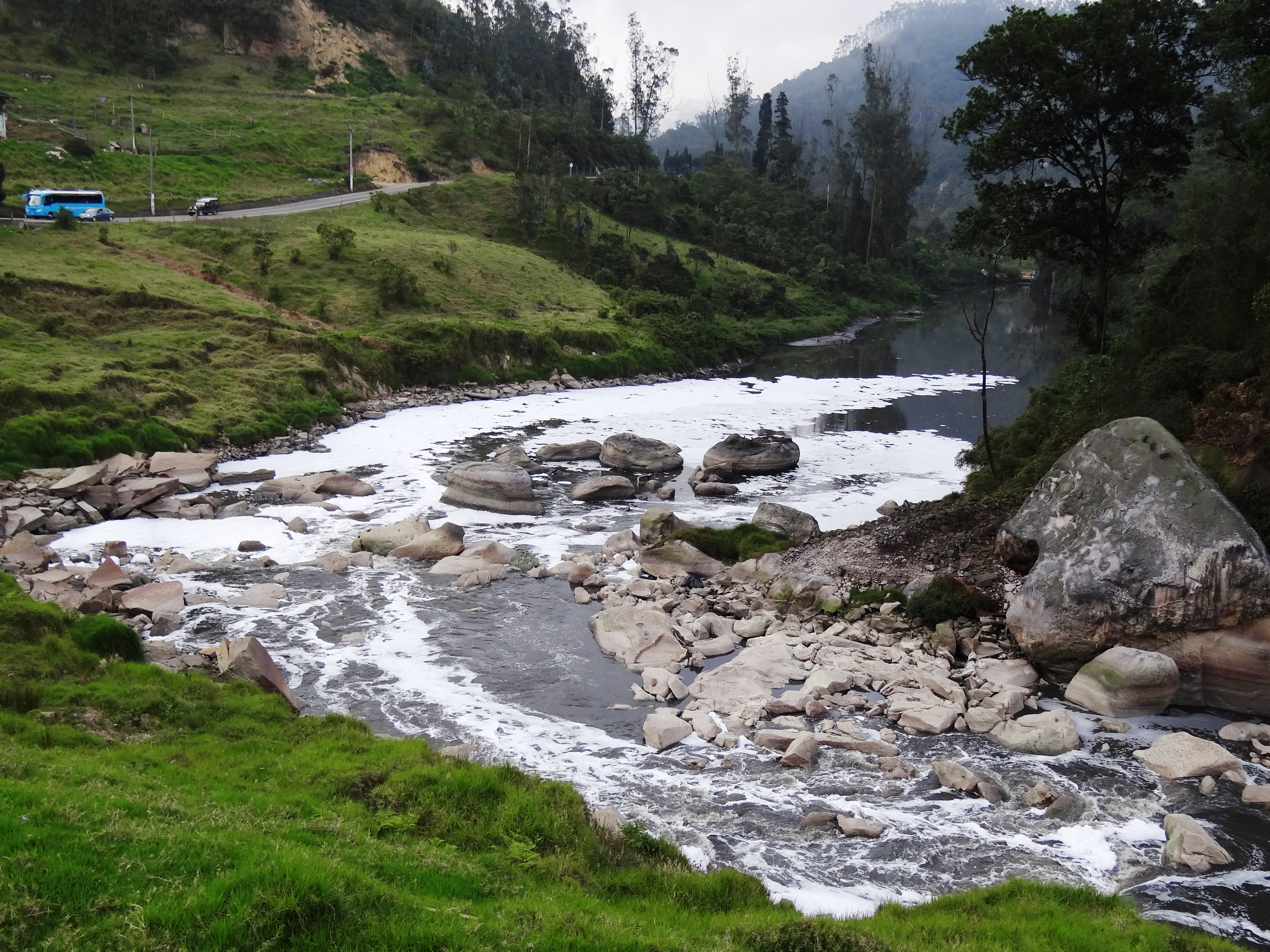
Bogotá River close to Tequendama

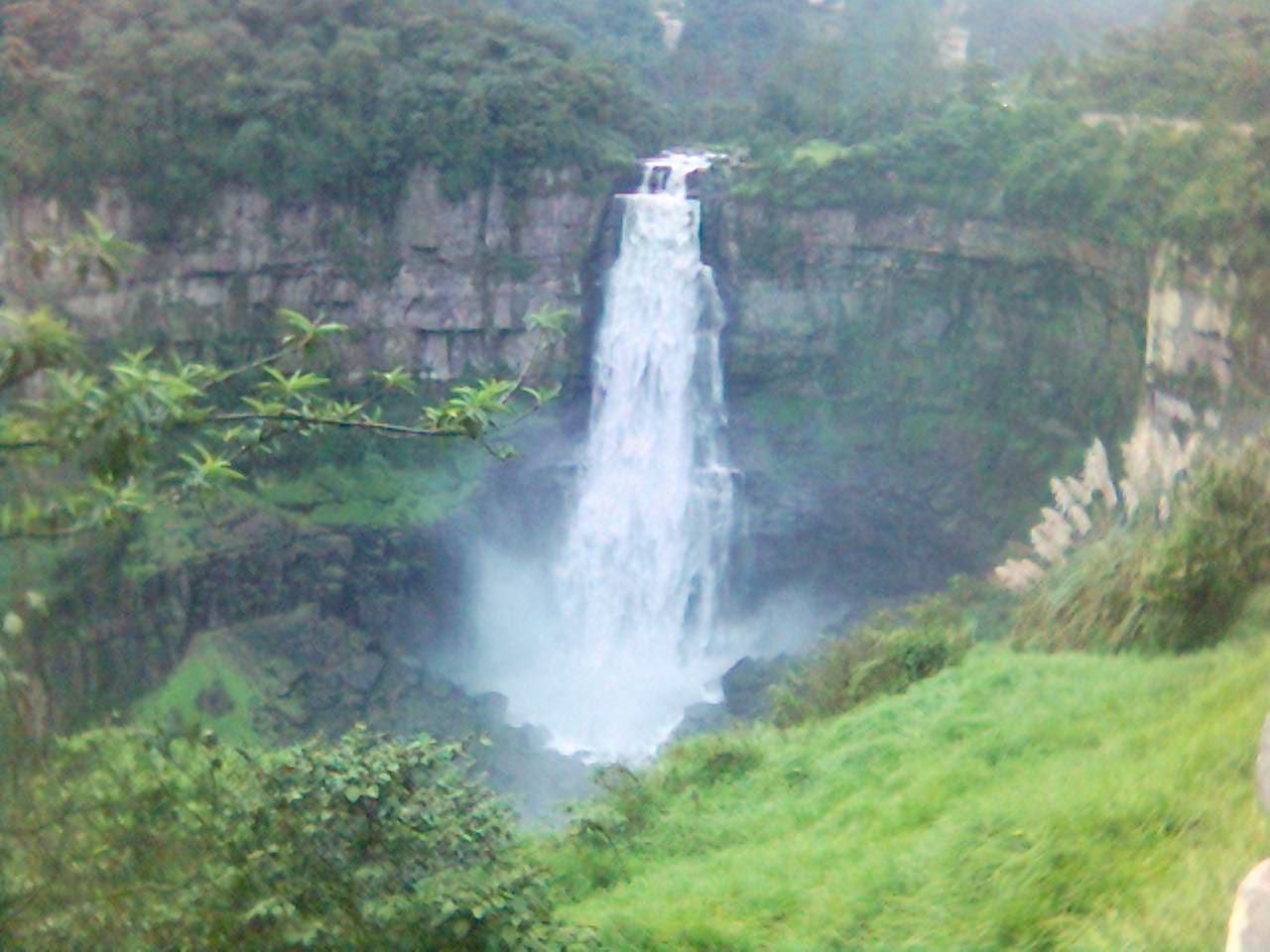
Tequendama Falls in the Bogotá River

== See also ==
- List of rivers of Colombia
- Bogotá savanna, Tequendama – archaeological site, earliest inhabitation along the Bogotá River
- Tequendama Falls
