= Bogotá savanna =

Motane savanna in Altiplano Cundiboyacense

- Sabana de Bogotá
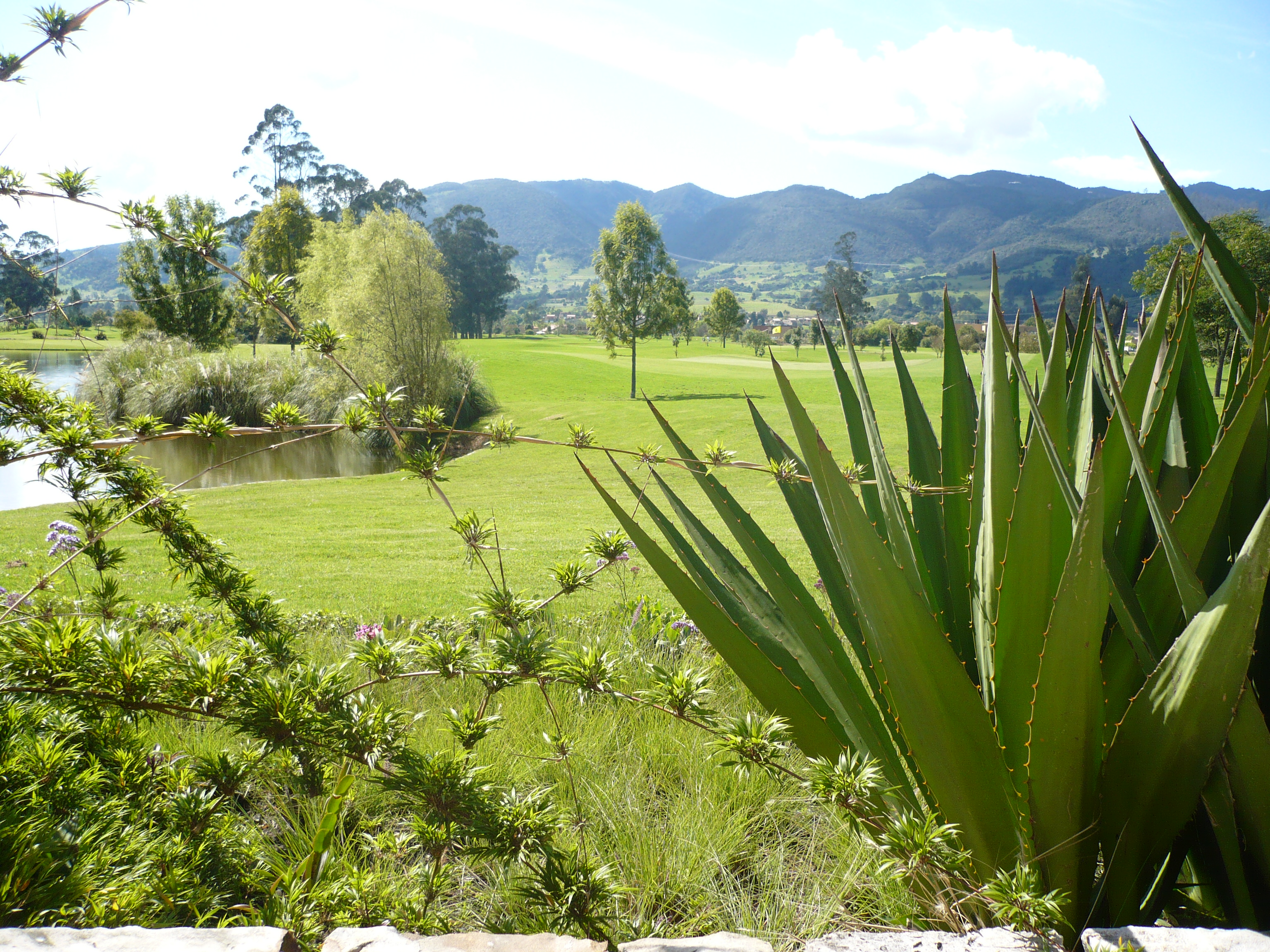
- The Bogotá savanna near the city of Bogotá

- Topography and outline of the Bogotá savanna
- Area: 4,251.6 km^{2} (1,641.6 mi^{2})

Geology
- Type: Montane savanna

Geography
- Country: Colombia
- State: Cundinamarca
- Region: Andean region
- Population center: Bogotá
- Borders on: East: Eastern Hills; South: Sumapaz mountains North: Hills of Tausa and Suesca; West: Western hills
- Coordinates: 4°45′0″N 74°10′30″W
- River: Bogotá, Teusacá, Torca, Juan Amarillo, Fucha, Tunjuelo

All but the southernmost locality Sumapaz of Bogotá is located on the Bogotá savanna

The Bogotá savanna is a montane savanna, located in the southwestern part of the Altiplano Cundiboyacense in the center of Colombia. The Bogotá savanna has an extent of 4,251.6 square kilometres (1,641.6 sq mi) and an average altitude of 2,650 metres (8,690 ft). The savanna is situated in the Eastern Ranges of the Colombian Andes.

The Bogotá savanna is crossed from northeast to southwest by the 375 kilometres (233 mi) long Bogotá River, which at the southwestern edge of the plateau forms the Tequendama Falls (Salto del Tequendama). Other rivers, such as the Subachoque, Bojacá, Fucha, Soacha and Tunjuelo Rivers, tributaries of the Bogotá River, form smaller valleys with very fertile soils utilized for agriculture and cattle-breeding.

Before the Spanish conquest of the Bogotá savanna, the area was inhabited by the indigenous Muisca, who formed a loose confederation of various caciques, named the Muisca Confederation. The Bogotá savanna, known as Muyquytá, was ruled by the zipa. The people specialised in agriculture, the mining of emeralds, trade and especially the extraction of rock salt from rocks in Zipaquirá, Nemocón, Tausa and other areas on the Bogotá savanna. The salt extraction, a task exclusively of the Muisca women, gave the Muisca the name "The Salt People."

Over the course of the 16th to early 20th century, the Bogotá savanna was sparsely populated and industrialised. The rise in population during the twentieth century and the expansion of agriculture and urbanisation reduced the biodiversity and natural habitat of the Bogotá savanna severely. Today, the Metropolitan Area of Bogotá on the Bogotá savanna hosts more than ten million people. Bogotá is the biggest city worldwide at altitudes above 2,500 metres (8,200 ft). The many rivers on the savanna are highly contaminated and efforts to solve the environmental problems have been conducted in the 21st century.

== Etymology ==
Bogotá savanna is named after Bogotá, which is derived from Muysccubun Bacatá, which means "(Enclosure) outside of the farm fields".

== Geography ==
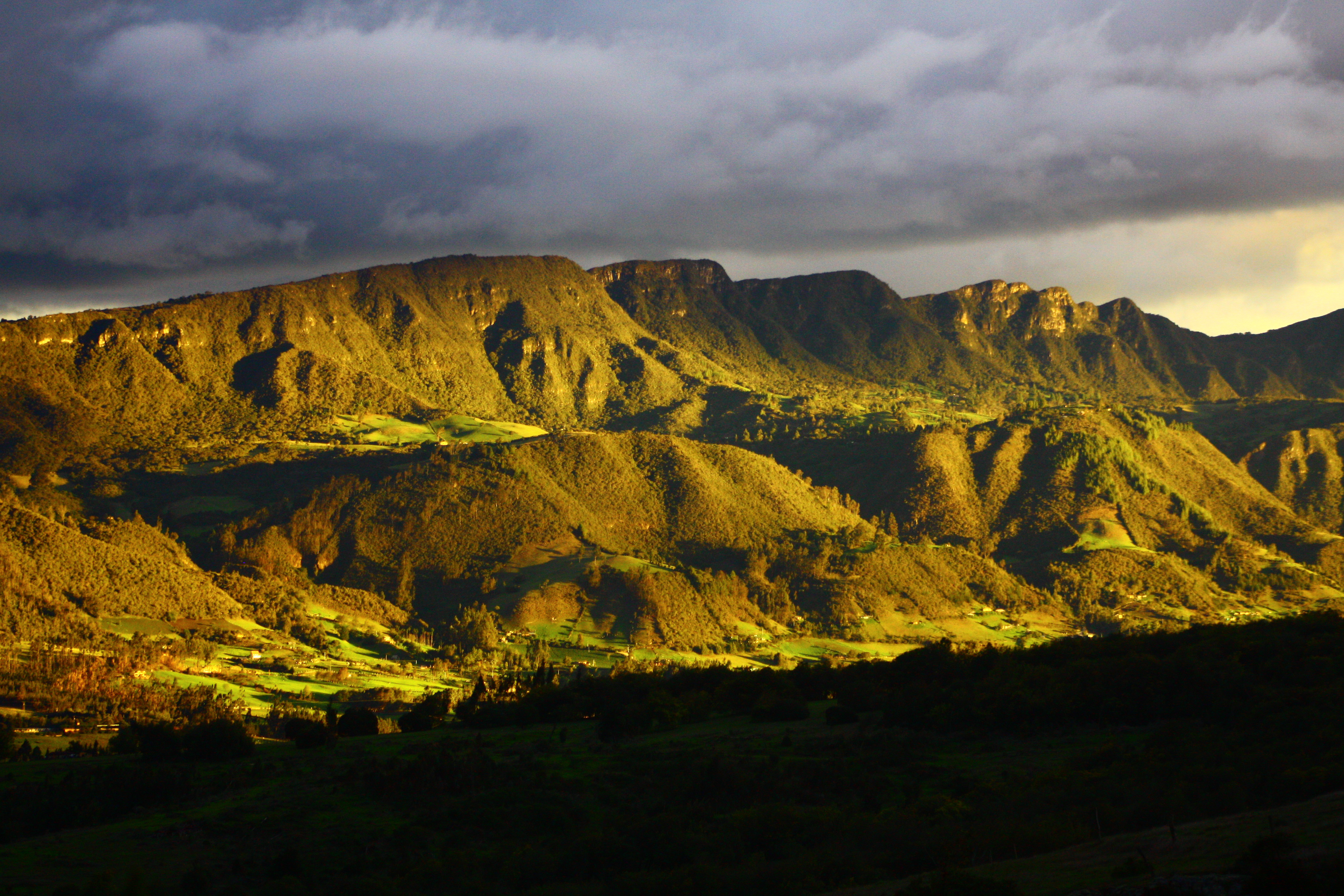
Hills of Sesquilé in the northeast of the Bogotá savanna

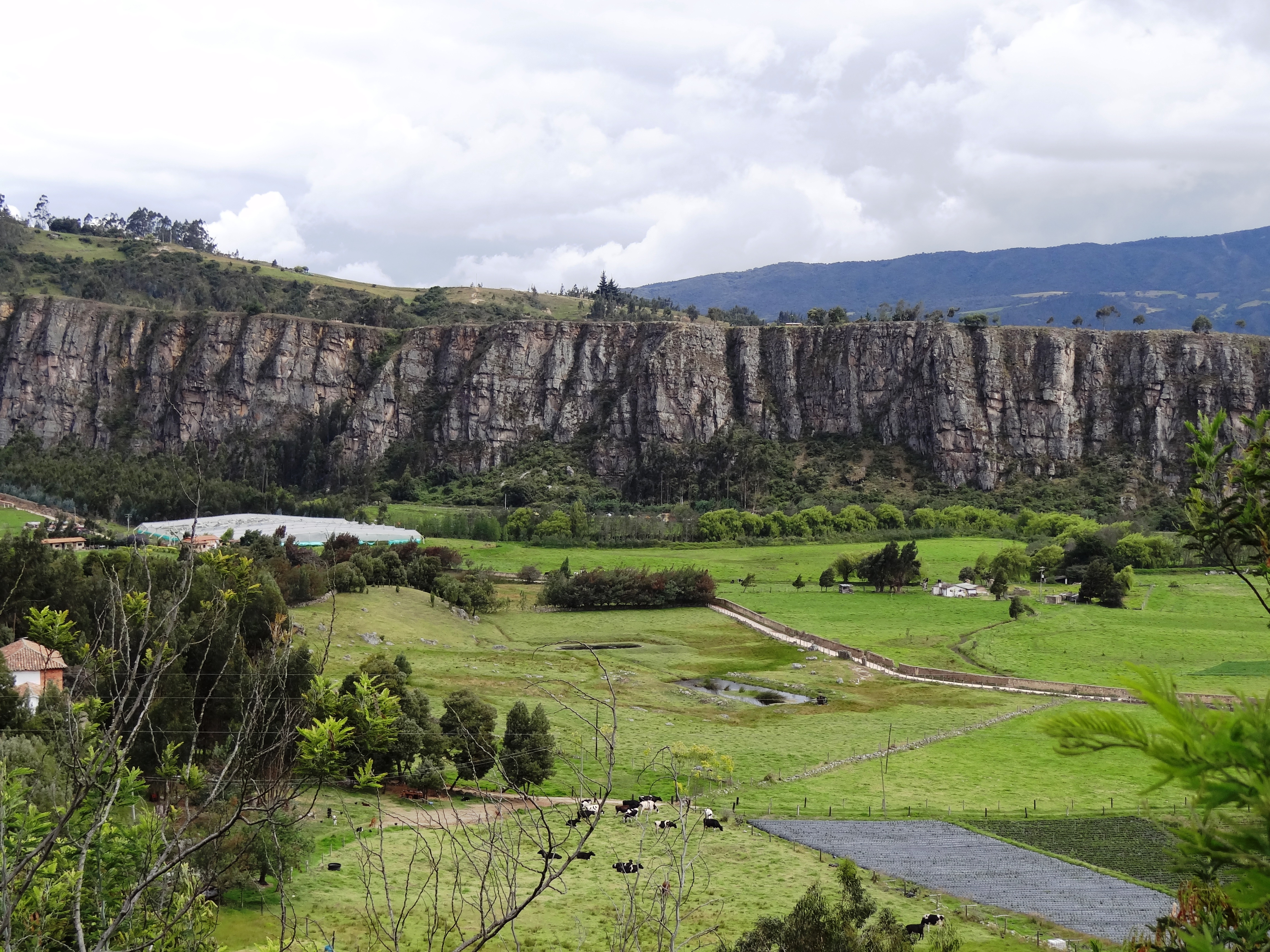
The climber's paradise Rocas de Suesca form the northeastern boundary of the Bogotá savanna

The Bogotá savanna is the southwestern part of the larger Andean plateau, the Altiplano Cundiboyacense. The savanna is a montane savanna, bordered to the east by the Eastern Hills, the Sumapaz mountains in the south, the hills of Tausa and Suesca in the north and western hills of Cundinamarca in the west. The total surface area is 4,251.6 square kilometres (1,641.6 sq mi).

=== Climate ===
The average temperature of the plateau is 14 °C (57 °F), but this can fluctuate between 0 and 24 °C (32 and 75 °F). The dry and rainy seasons alternate frequently during the year. The driest months are December, January, February and March. During the rainy months, the temperature tends to be more stable with variations between 9 and 20 °C (48 and 68 °F). June, July and August are the months that present the largest variations of temperature, and during the morning frost in the higher terrains surrounding the savanna is possible. Sometimes also ground frost is present, which has a negative impact on agriculture. Hail is a relatively common phenomenon on the savanna.

=== Hydrology ===
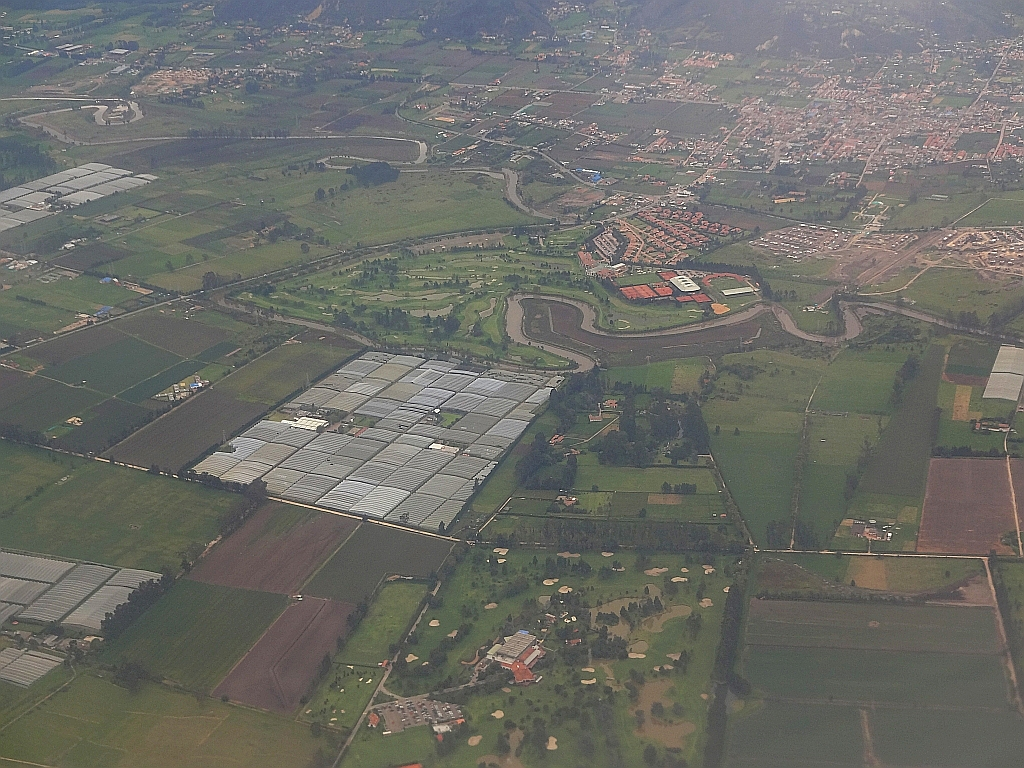
The Bogotá River separating Cota, Cundinamarca (top) from Bogotá

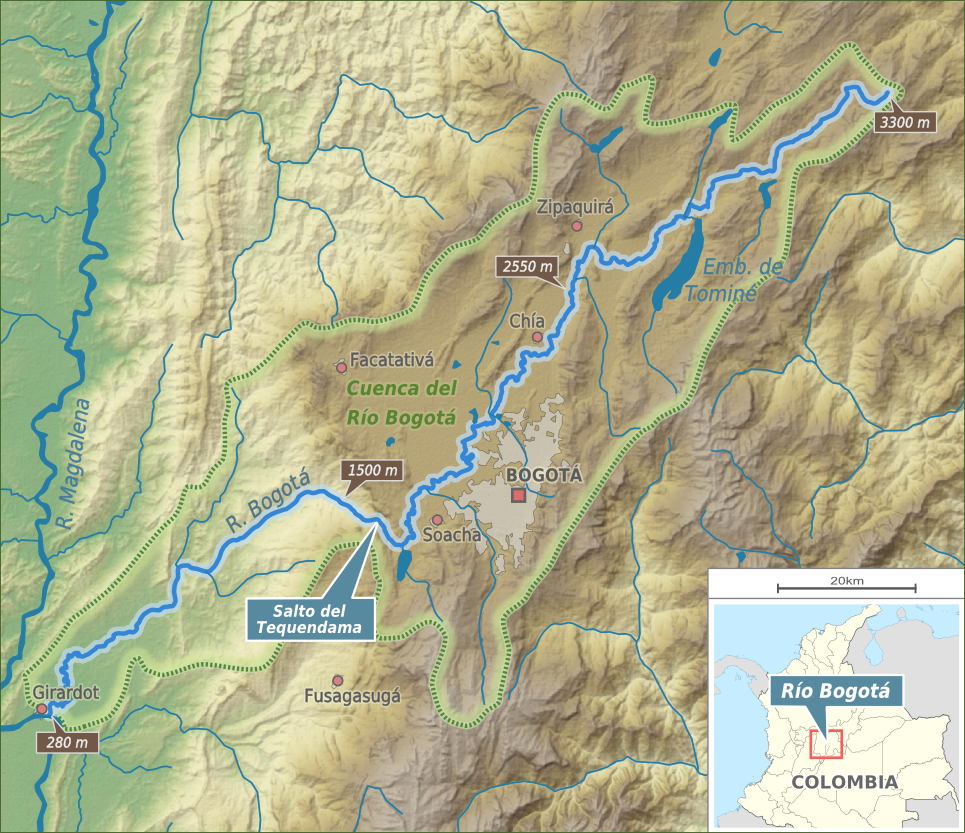
The Bogotá River is the main river of the Bogotá savanna

==== Rivers ====
- Bogotá River - 375 kilometres (14,800,000 in)
  - Bojacá River
  - Fucha River
  - Teusacá River
  - Juan Amarillo River
  - Tunjuelo River
  - Soacha River
  - Neusa River
  - Río Frío
  - Subachoque River

==== Lakes ====
===== Natural =====
- Lake Guatavita - overlooking the northeastern part of the savanna
- Lake Herrera

===== Artificial =====
- Tominé Reservoir - northeast, biggest waterbody on the Bogotá savanna - 690 cubic megametres (2.4×10^{22} cu ft)
- Neusa Reservoir - north - 102 cubic megametres (3.6×10^{21} cu ft)
- El Muña Reservoir - south - 42 cubic megametres (1.5×10^{21} cu ft)
- Lake Herrera (since 1973)

=== Waterfalls ===
- Tequendama Falls - southwestern limit

=== Wetlands ===
There is a system of wetlands (humedales) that regulate the soil moisture acting like sponges for the rain waters. Fifteen wetlands have a protected status, with various wetlands as unprotected. In 1950, the total surface area of the wetlands amounted to 150,000 hectares (370,000 acres), but due to the urbanisation of the Colombian capital the total area has been reduced to 1,500 hectares (3,700 acres).

Map
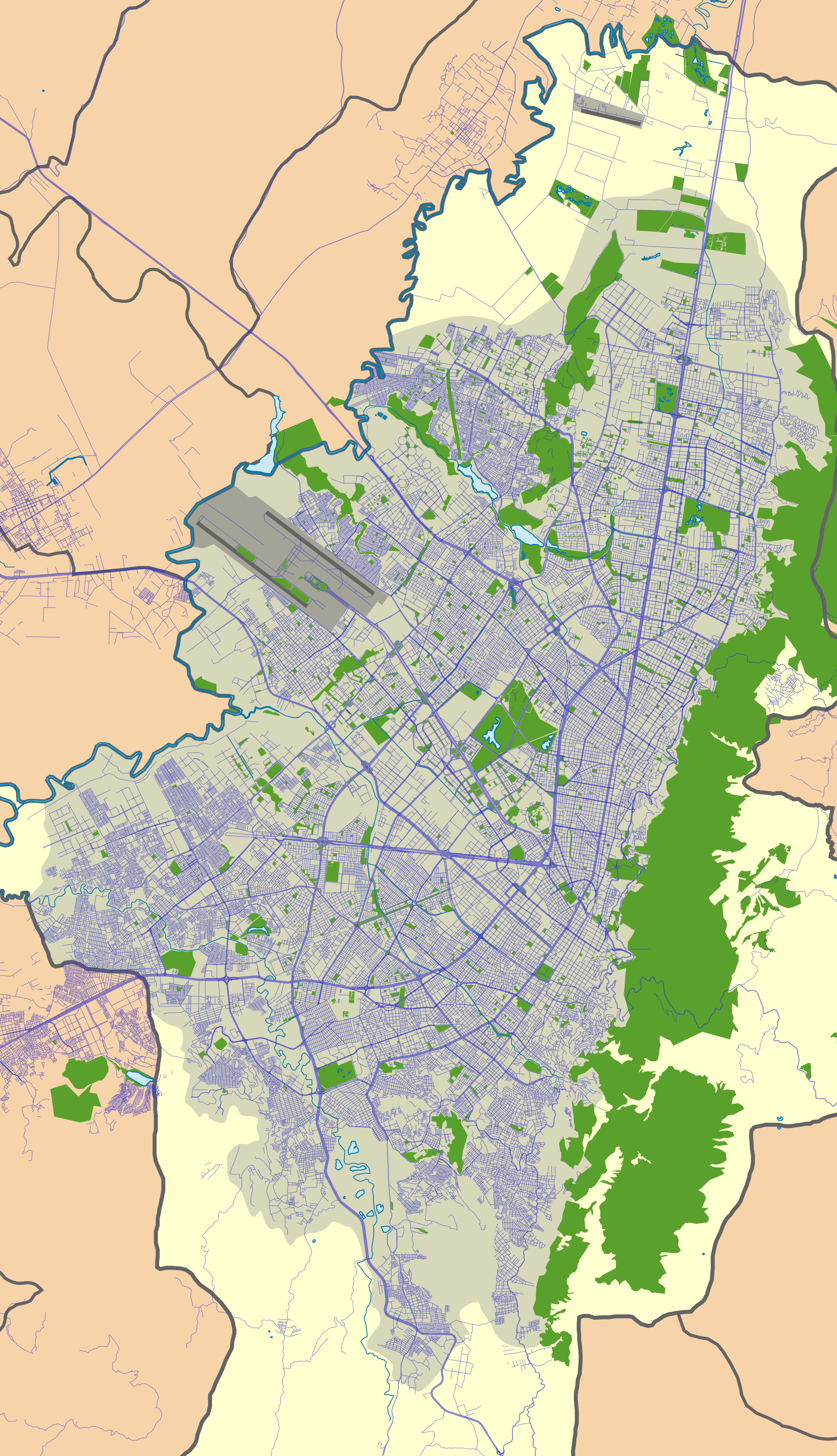
Wetlands within Bogotá
Torca River basin
Juan Amarillo River basin
Fucha River basin
Tunjuelo River basin

Wetland	Location	Altitude (m)	Area (ha)	Notes	Image
Guaymaral y Torca	Usaquén; Suba	2547	73		
La Conejera	Suba	2544	58.9		
Córdoba	Suba	2548	40.51		
Tibabuyes; Juan Amarillo	Suba; Engativá	2539	222.58		
Jaboque	Engativá	2539	148		
Santa María del Lago	Engativá	2549	12		
El Burro	Kennedy	2541	18.84		
La Vaca	Kennedy	2548	7.96		
Techo	Techo, Kennedy	2545	11.46		
Capellanía	Fontibón	2542	27.05		
Meandro del Say	Fontibón; Mosquera	2548	13.6		
Tibanica	Bosa; Soacha	2542	28.8		
El Salitre	Barrios Unidos	2558	6.4		
La Isla	Bosa	2550	7.7		
La Florida	Funza	2542	26		

== Biodiversity ==
Despite the continuous urbanisation and industrial activities, the Bogotá savanna is a rich biodiverse area with many bird species registered. The diversity of mammals, amphibians and reptiles is much lower. Before the arrival of the European colonisers, the savanna was populated predominantly by white-tailed deer, the main ingredient of the Muisca cuisine. Today, this species of deer, as well as the once common spectacled bear, is restricted to protected areas surrounding the Bogotá savanna. The Thomas van der Hammen Natural Reserve is a protected area in the north of Bogotá.

== History ==
Preceramic sites on the Bogotá savanna
Ab - El Abra
Ti - Tibitó
Te - Tequendama
P - Piedras del Tunjo
Ag - Aguazuque
C - Checua
H - Lake Herrera

The earliest confirmed inhabitation of present-day Colombia was on the Bogotá savanna with sites El Abra, Tequendama and Tibitó, where semi-nomadic hunter-gatherers lived in caves and rock shelters. One of the first evidences of settlement in open area space was Aguazuque, whose oldest dated remains are analysed to be 5000 years old. This prehistorical preceramic period was followed by the Herrera Period, commonly defined from 800 BCE to 800 AD.

=== Muisca Confederation ===
At the arrival of the Spanish conquistadors, the region was inhabited by the Muisca who lived in hundreds of small villages scattered across the plateau. These villages were individually ruled by caciques who at the same time paid tribute to the zipa, ruler of Bacatá. The Muisca were known as "The Salt People", thanks to their extraction of rock salt from brines in large pots heated over fires. This process was the exclusive task of the Muisca women.

The economy of the Muisca, meaning "person" or "people" in their indigenous version of Chibcha; Muysccubun, was self-sufficient due to the advanced agriculture on the fertile soils of the frequently flooding Bogotá savanna. More tropical and subtropical agricultural products as avocadoes and cotton were traded with their neighbours, in particular the Guane and Lache in the north and northeast and the Guayupe, Achagua and Tegua in the east.

The Muisca were known as skilled goldworkers, represented in the famous Muisca raft, that symbolises the initiation ritual of the new zipa in Lake Guatavita. This ritual, where the zipa covered himself in gold dust and jumped in the 3,000 metres (9,800 ft) altitude lake, gave rise to the -not so much- legend of El Dorado.

=== Spanish conquest ===
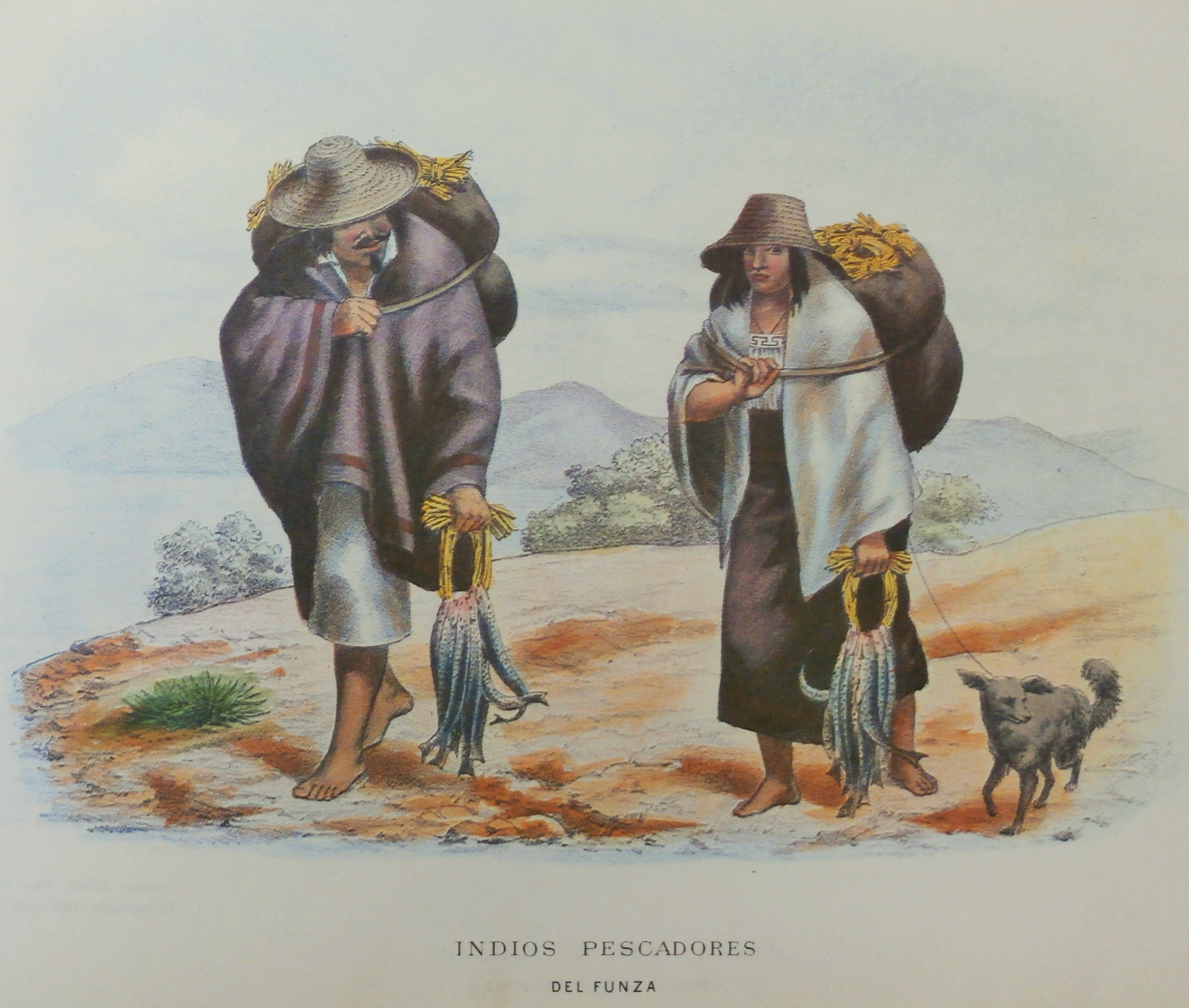
Indigenous Muisca fishermen in Funza Litho in 1860 by Ramón Torres Méndez

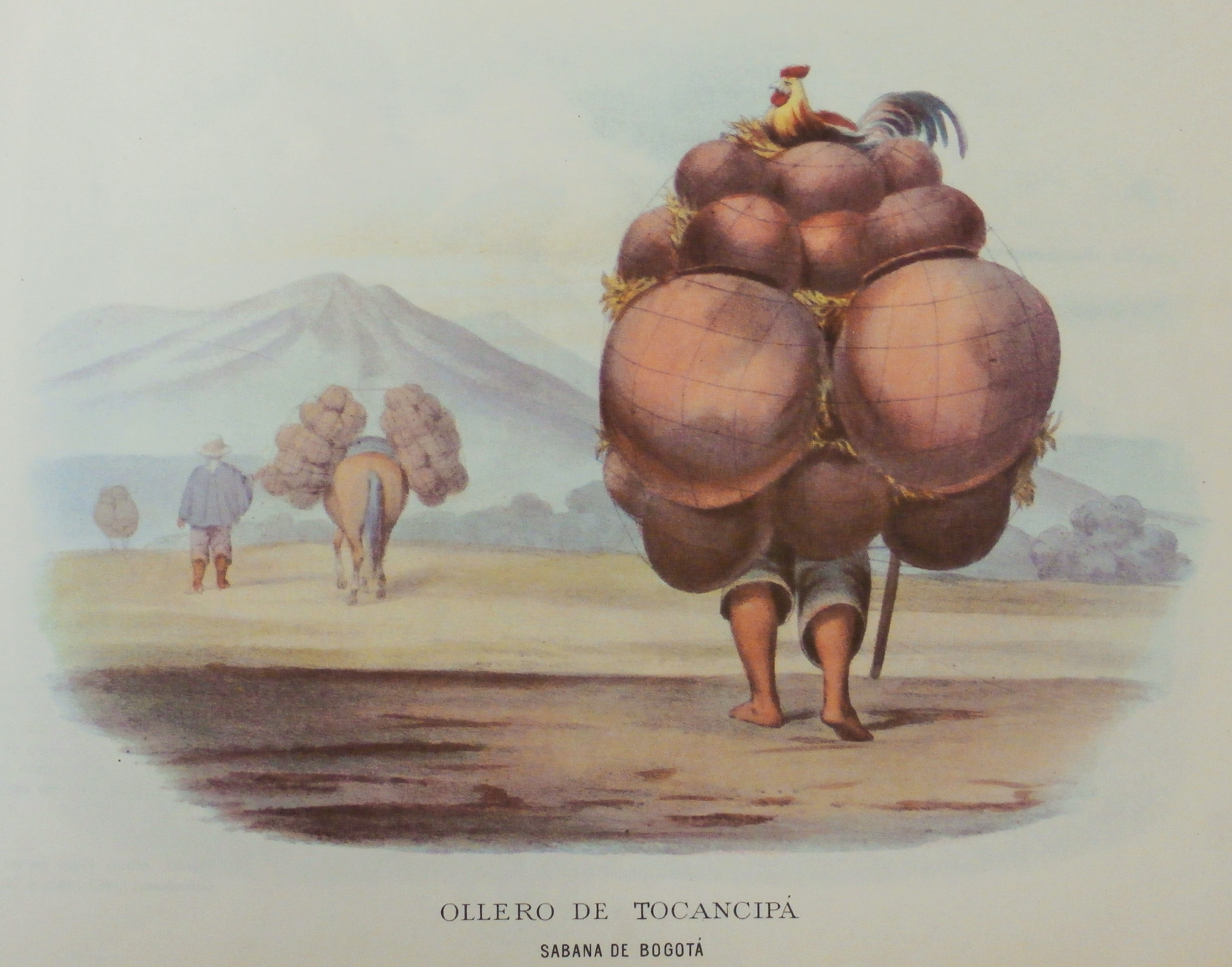
Pottery producing Muisca in Tocancipá Litho in 1860 by Ramón Torres Méndez

In April 1536, a group of around 800 conquistadors left the relative safety of the Caribbean coastal city of Santa Marta to start a strenuous expedition up the Magdalena River, the main fluvial artery of Colombia. Word got around among the Spanish colonisers that deep in the unknown Andes, a rich area with an advanced civilisation must exist. These tales bore the -not so much- legend of El Dorado; the city or man of gold. The Muisca, skilled goldworkers, held a ritual in Lake Guatavita where the new zipa would cover himself in gold dust and jump from a raft into the cold waters of the 3,000 metres (9,800 ft) high lake to the northeast of the Bogotá savanna.

After a journey of almost a year, where the Spanish lost over 80% of their soldiers, the conquistadors following the Suárez River, reached the Bogotá savanna in March 1537. The zipa who ruled the Bogotá savanna at the arrival of the Spanish was Tisquesusa. The Muisca posed little resistance to the Spanish strangers and Tisquesusa was defeated in April 1537 in Funza, in the centre of the savanna. He fled towards the western hills and died of his wounds in Facatativá, on the southwestern edge of the Bogotá savanna. The Spanish conquistador Gonzalo Jiménez de Quesada established the New Kingdom of Granada with capital Santa Fe de Bogotá on August 6, 1538. This started a process of colonisation, evangelisation and submittance of the Muisca to the new rule. Between 65 and 80% of the indigenous people perished due to European diseases as smallpox and typhus. The Spanish introduced new crops, replacing many of the New World crops that the Muisca cultivated.

The Spanish colonizers engaged in the construction of Spanish-style towns to replace all the indigenous villages and in the process of assimilation and religious convert of the Muisca. The majority of those villages kept their indigenous names, but some were slightly modified in time, like Suacha which became Soacha, Hyntiba becoming Fontibón and Bacatá becoming Bogotá.

=== Modern history ===
Over the course of the 16th to early 20th century, the Bogotá savanna was sparsely populated and industrialised. The rise in population during the twentieth century and the expansion of agriculture and urbanisation reduced the biodiversity and natural habitat of the Bogotá savanna severely. Today, the Metropolitan Area of Bogotá on the Bogotá savanna hosts more than ten million people. Bogotá is the biggest city worldwide at altitudes above 2,500 metres (8,200 ft). The many rivers on the savanna are highly contaminated and efforts to solve the environmental problems are conducted in the 21st century.

=== Timeline of inhabitation ===
Timeline of inhabitation of the Bogotá savanna, Colombia
Altiplano Muisca Confederation

== Cities ==
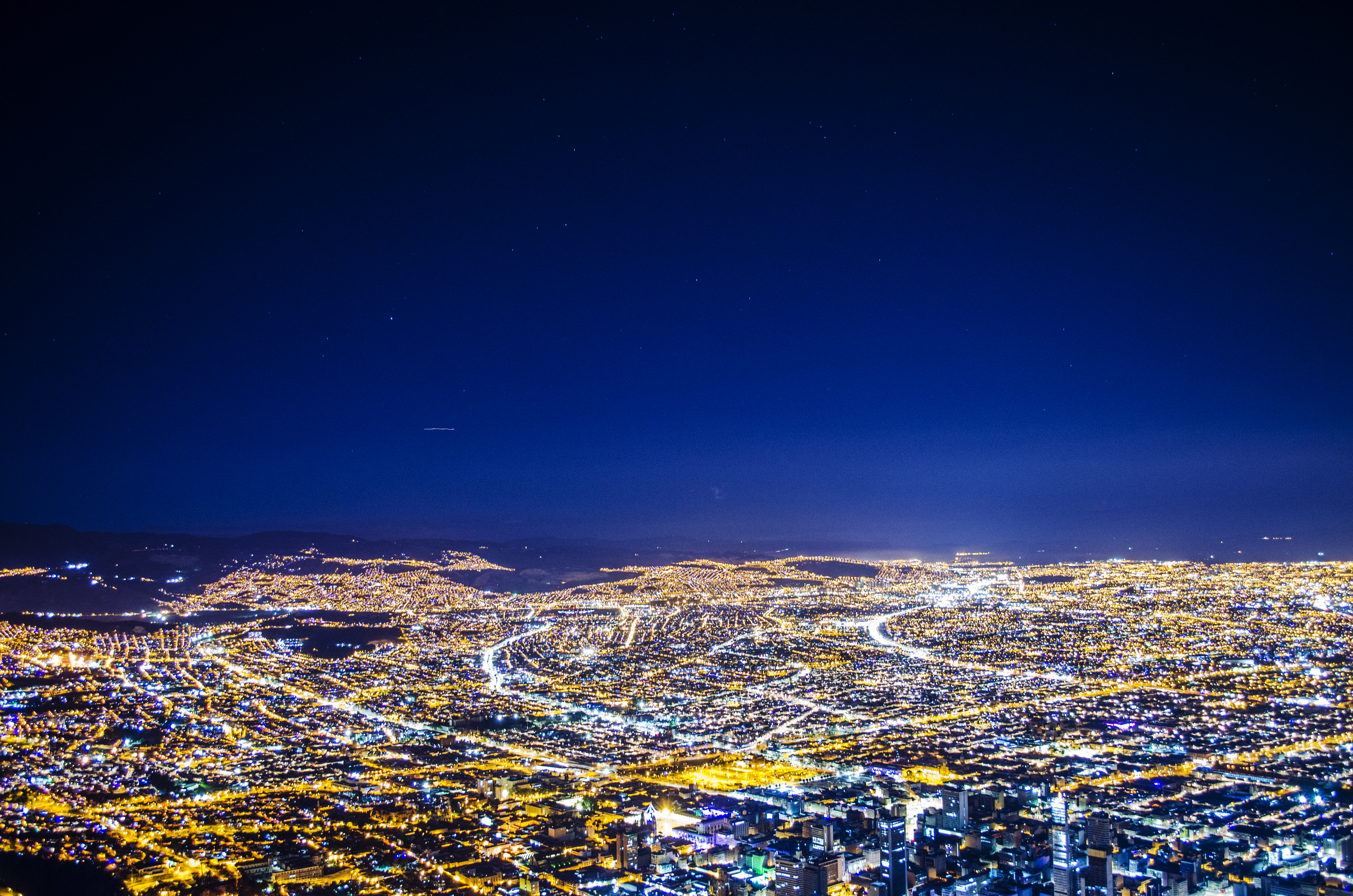
The capital of Colombia, Bogotá, here seen at night from Monserrate, is the main city on the Bogotá savanna. The flatland is clearly visible

The main cities of the Bogotá savanna, in addition to the capital city of Bogotá, are: Mosquera, Soacha, Madrid, Funza, Facatativá, Subachoque, El Rosal, Tabio, Tenjo, Cota, Chía, Cajicá, Zipaquirá, Nemocón, Sopó, Tocancipá, Gachancipá, Sesquilé, Suesca, Chocontá and Guatavita.

=== List of municipalities ===
Municipality Locality	Altitude urban centre (m)	Surface area (km^{2})	Inhabitants (Note: 07; 2007, 15; 2015, 16; 2016)	Remarks	Map
Bogotá	2640	1587	7,980,001^{16}	Named after Bacatá (Note: Bacatá refers to the southern part of the Bogotá savanna, ruled by the zipa based in Funza, but with various frequently visited other settlements, visibles in the names Nemocón (Nemequene), Zipacón, Zipaquirá, Tocancipá, Gachancipá); Capital of Colombia; Biggest city at altitudes above 2,500 metres (8,200 ft)	
Usaquén	2650	65.31	449,621^{16}		
Chapinero	2640	38.15	122,507^{07}		
Santa Fe	2640	45.17	96,241^{07}		
San Cristóbal	2640	49.09	404,350^{07}		
Usme	2700	119.04	314,431^{07}		
Tunjuelito	2600	9.91	182,532^{07}		
Bosa	2600	23.93	637,283^{15}		
Kennedy	2700	38.59	979,914^{07}		
Fontibón	2600	33.28	317,179^{07}		
Engativá	2600	35.88	824,337^{07}		
Suba	2700	100.56	1,161,500^{16}		
Barrios Unidos	2600	11.9	230,066^{07}		
Teusaquillo	2600	14.19	139,298^{07}		
Los Mártires	2600	6.51	94,944^{07}		
Antonio Nariño	2600	4.88	119,565^{07}		
Puente Aranda	2600	17.31	250,715^{07}		
La Candelaria	2640	2.06	22,115^{07}		
Rafael Uribe Uribe	2600	13.83	378.780^{07}		
Ciudad Bolívar	2700	130	593,937^{07}		
Soacha	2565	184.45	522,442^{16}	Preceramic site Tequendama; Herrera site Muisca ceramics production Petrographs found	
Sibaté	2700	125.6	38,412^{15}	Petrographs found El Muña Reservoir	
Mosquera	2516	107	82,750^{15}	Lake Herrera; Petrographs found	
Bojacá	2598	109	11,254^{15}	Lake Herrera; Petrographs found	
Chía	2564	80	129,652^{16}	Moon Temple; Herrera site Petrographs found	
Cota	2566	55	24,916^{15}	Petrographs found Muisca community	
Cajicá	2558	50.4	56,875^{15}	Located in the funnel of the northern savanna	
Facatativá	2586	158	134,522^{15}	Piedras del Tunjo	
Funza	2548	70	75,350^{15}	Muisca market town	
Madrid	2554	120.5	77,627^{15}	Lake Herrera; Petrographs found	
El Rosal	2685	86.48	17,254^{15}		
Zipacón	2550	70	5570^{15}	Agriculture; Place of meditation for the zipa Petrographs found	
Subachoque	2663	211.53	16,117^{15}	Petrographs found	
Tabio	2569	74.5	27,033^{15}	Hot springs used by the Muisca	
Tenjo	2587	108	18,387^{15}	Petrographs found	
Zipaquirá	2650	197	124,376^{15}	El Abra; Muisca salt mines Important market town Petrographs and petroglyphs found	
Nemocón	2585	98.1	13,488^{15}	Muisca salt mines Preceramic site Checua; Petrographs found	
Cogua	2600	113	22,361^{15}	Muisca ceramics production Petrographs found Neusa Reservoir	
Tocancipá	2605	73.51	31,975^{15}	Preceramic site Tibitó; Muisca ceramics production Important market town Petrographs found	
Gachancipá	2568	44	14,442^{15}	Muisca mummy found Muisca ceramics production	
Guasca	2710	346	14,759^{15}	Siecha Lakes; Muisca ceramics production Petrographs found	
Guatavita	2680	247.3	6898^{15}	Muisca ceramics production Main goldworking town Petrographs found Tominé Reservoir	
Sopó	2650	111.5	26,769^{15}	Herrera site	
Sesquilé	2595	141	13,936^{15}	Lake Guatavita; Minor Muisca salt mines	
Suesca	2584	177	17,318^{15}	150 Muisca mummies found Lake Suesca; Muisca ceramics production Important market town Petrographs found	

== Panoramas ==
Panoramas
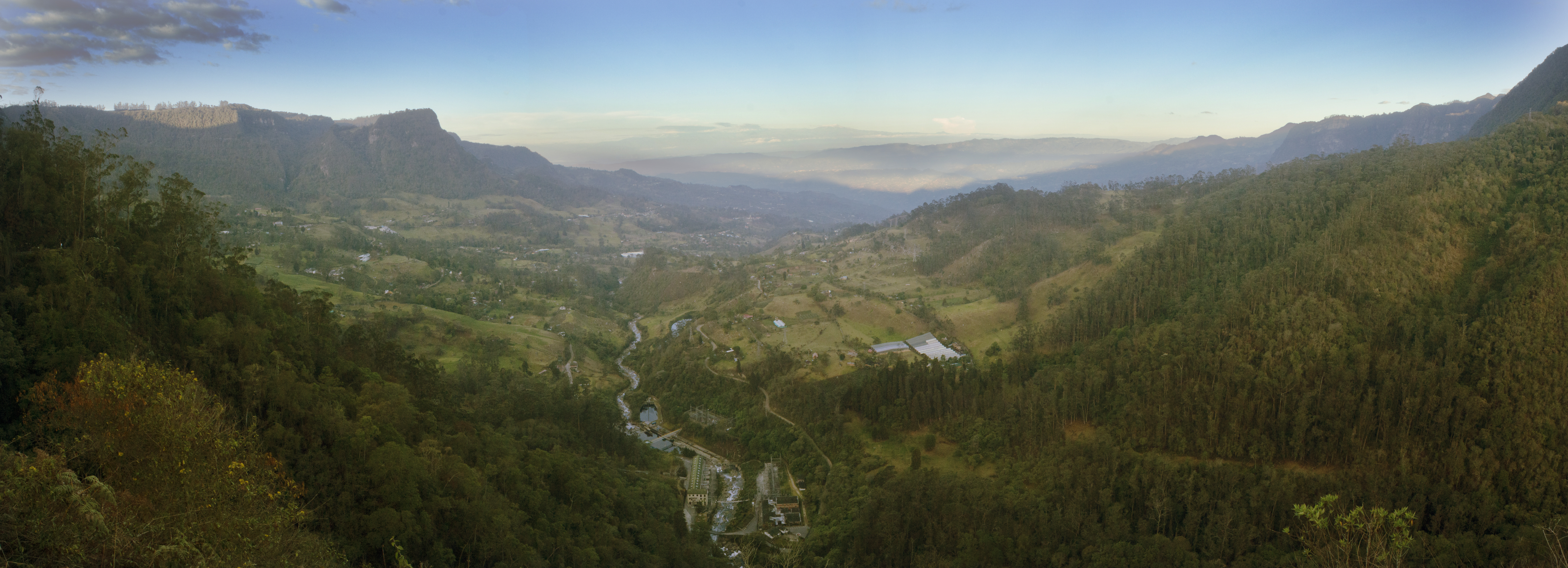
Panorama of the Tena Valley to the southwest of the Bogotá savanna, near San Antonio del Tequendama
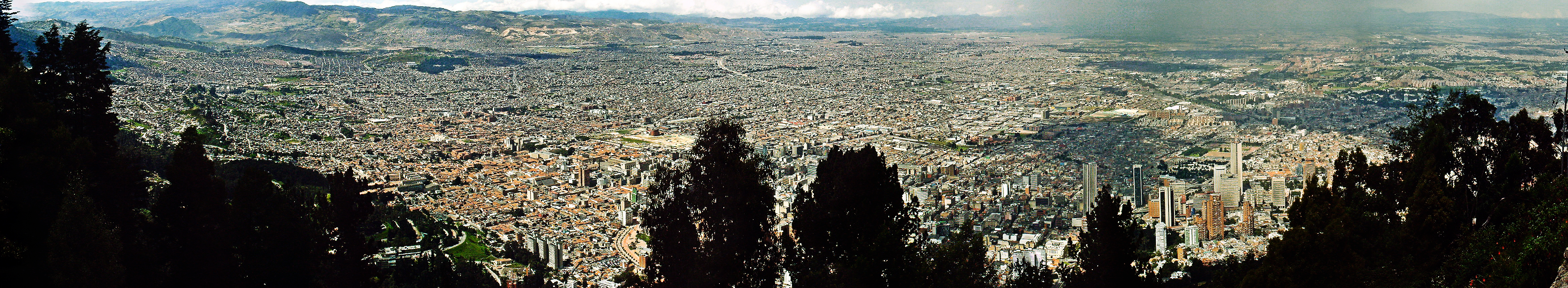
Bogotá on the savanna
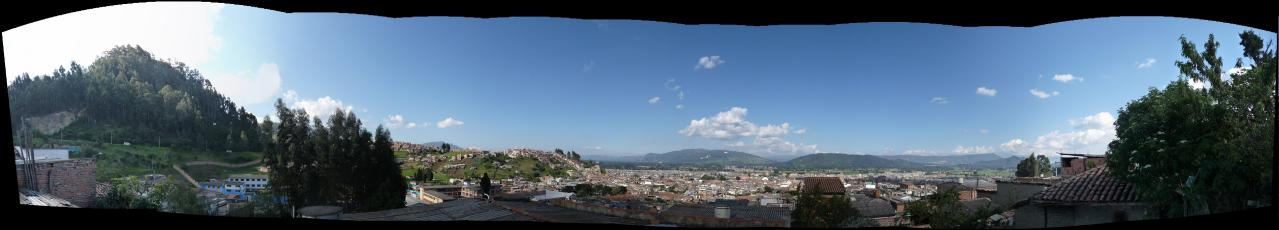
Zipaquirá
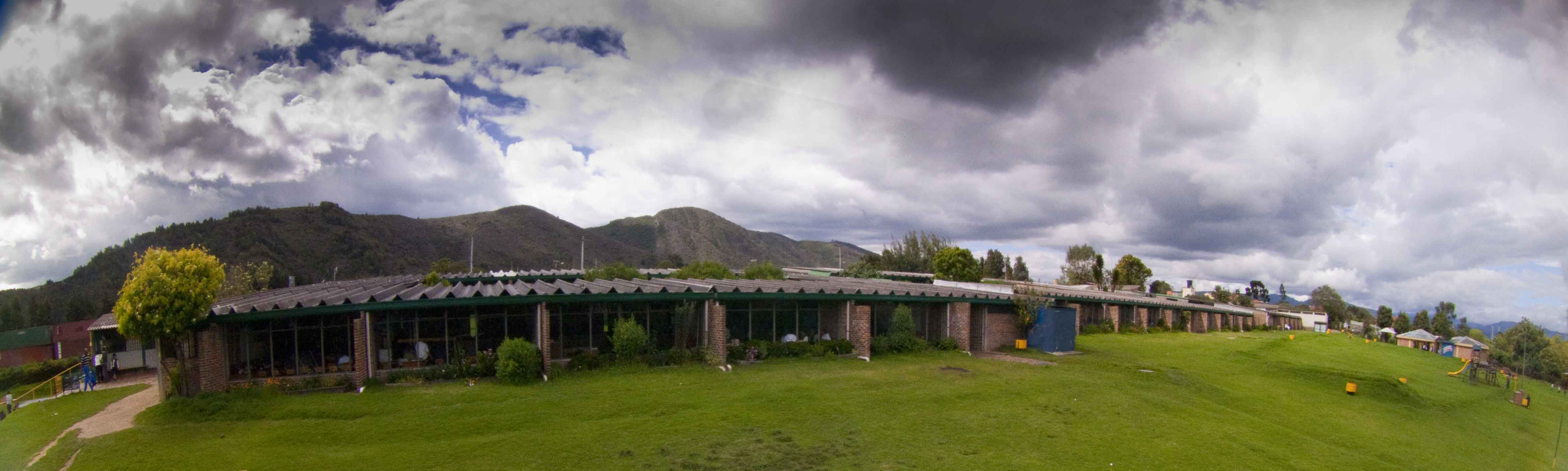
School in Cota
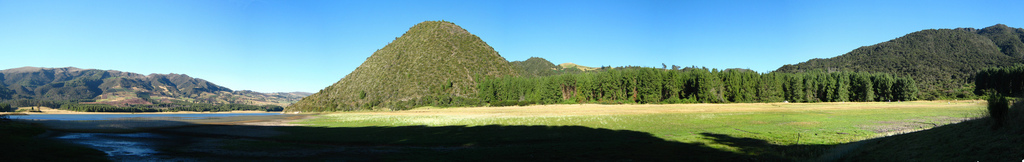
The northwestern part of the ancient Lake Humboldt is artificially represented in the Neusa Reservoir
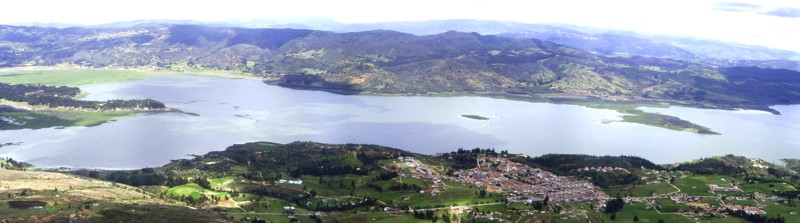
Tominé Reservoir
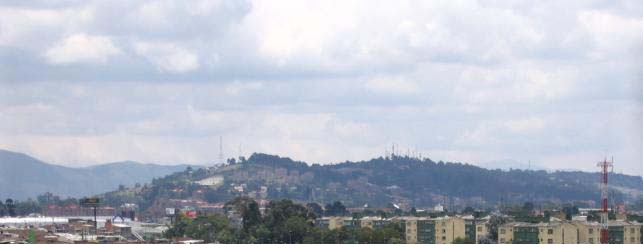
Suba Hills
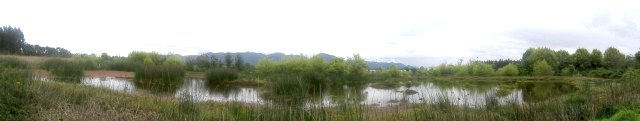
La Conejera wetland

== See also ==
- Eastern Ranges
  - Eastern Hills, Bogotá
  - Ocetá Páramo
  - Altiplano Cundiboyacense
  - neighbouring Tenza Valley, Sumapaz Páramo
- Bogotá Savannah Railway
- Train for the vicinities of the city of Bogotá
- Thomas van der Hammen
