= Torca River =

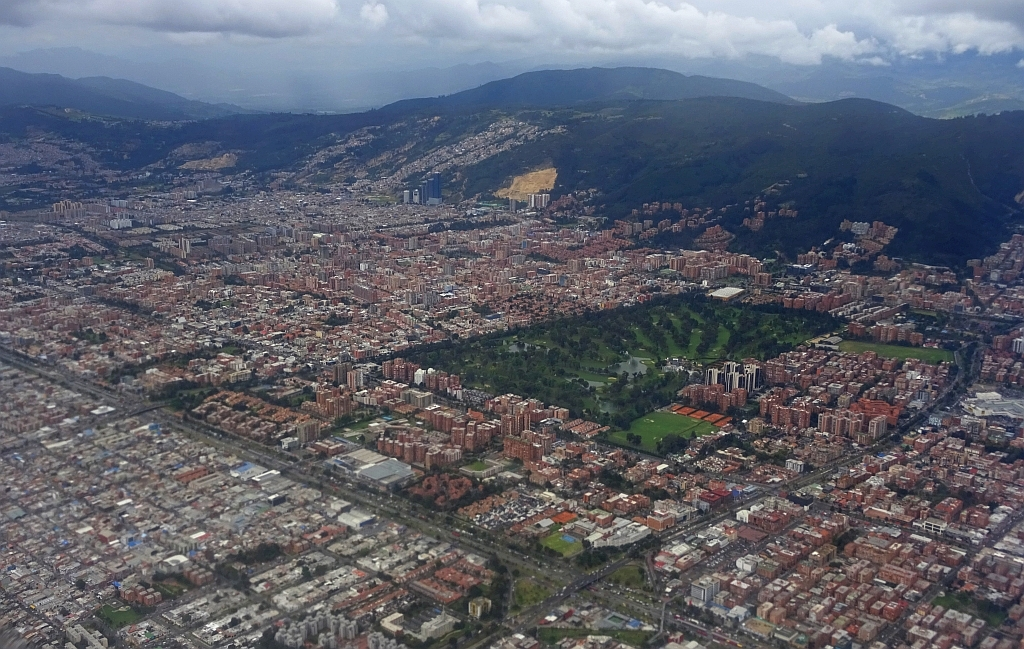
- The Torca River originates near the quarry in the Eastern Hills

- Location of the Torca River in Colombia
- Etymology: Muysccubun
- Native name: Río Torca (Spanish)

Location
- Country: Colombia
- Department: Cundinamarca
- Municipalities: Bogotá; Chía
- Localities: Usaquén; Suba

Physical characteristics
- Source: Eastern Hills
  - location: Usaquén
  - coordinates: 4°43′38.8″N 74°01′01.5″W
  - elevation: 2,837 m (9,308 ft)
- Mouth: Bogotá River
  - location: Suba, Chía
  - coordinates: 4°49′58.8″N 74°02′38.6″W
  - elevation: 2,545 m (8,350 ft)
- Basin size: 6,008.69 ha (23.1997 sq mi)

Basin features
- River system: Bogotá River; Magdalena Basin; Caribbean Sea
- Waterbodies: Torca (wetland)
- Bridges: Autopista Norte

The Torca River (Spanish: Río Torca) is a river on the Bogotá savanna and a left tributary of the Bogotá River. The river, in a basin of 6,008.69 hectares (23.1997 sq mi), originates in the Eastern Hills of Bogotá at an altitude of 2,837 metres (9,308 ft). It flows in the north of the Colombian capital, through the locality of Usaquén and into the Bogotá River in Suba at the border with Chía, at 2,545 metres (8,350 ft) above sea level. The Torca wetland is located near its mouth.

== Description ==
Source and mouth of the Torca River on the Bogotá savanna

The Torca River originates in the Eastern Hills, in the locality of Usaquén in the north of the Colombian capital. The river enters the urban area of the city near the Bosques de Pinos complex at Carrera 6 with Calle 153. The basin of the Torca River has an area of 6,008.69 hectares (23.1997 sq mi) and along the principal axis the basin extends for 13.06 kilometres (8.12 mi). Part of its course is channelised, called El Cedro and Torca channel. The Torca River flows into the Bogotá River near the Torca wetland at the border of Bogotá and Chía. The Autopista Norte crosses the Torca River basin. The river has a high level of contamination.

== Wetland ==
The 24 hectares (0.093 sq mi) wetland of Torca is located in the Torca River basin. Amphibians registered in Torca are among others the green dotted treefrog (Hyla labialis) and the cream-backed poison frog (Colostethus subpunctatus). In Torca, 24 bird species have been registered, among others the cattle egret (Bubulcus ibis), Bogotá rail (Rallus semiplumbeus), common moorhen (Gallinula chloropus), noble snipe (Gallinago nobilis), solitary sandpiper (Tringa solitaria), grassland yellow finch (Sicalis luteola) and the endemic species to Colombia, yellow-hooded blackbird (Chrysomus icterocephalus). The flora species Carex lanuginosa was a new discovery in the Torca wetland.

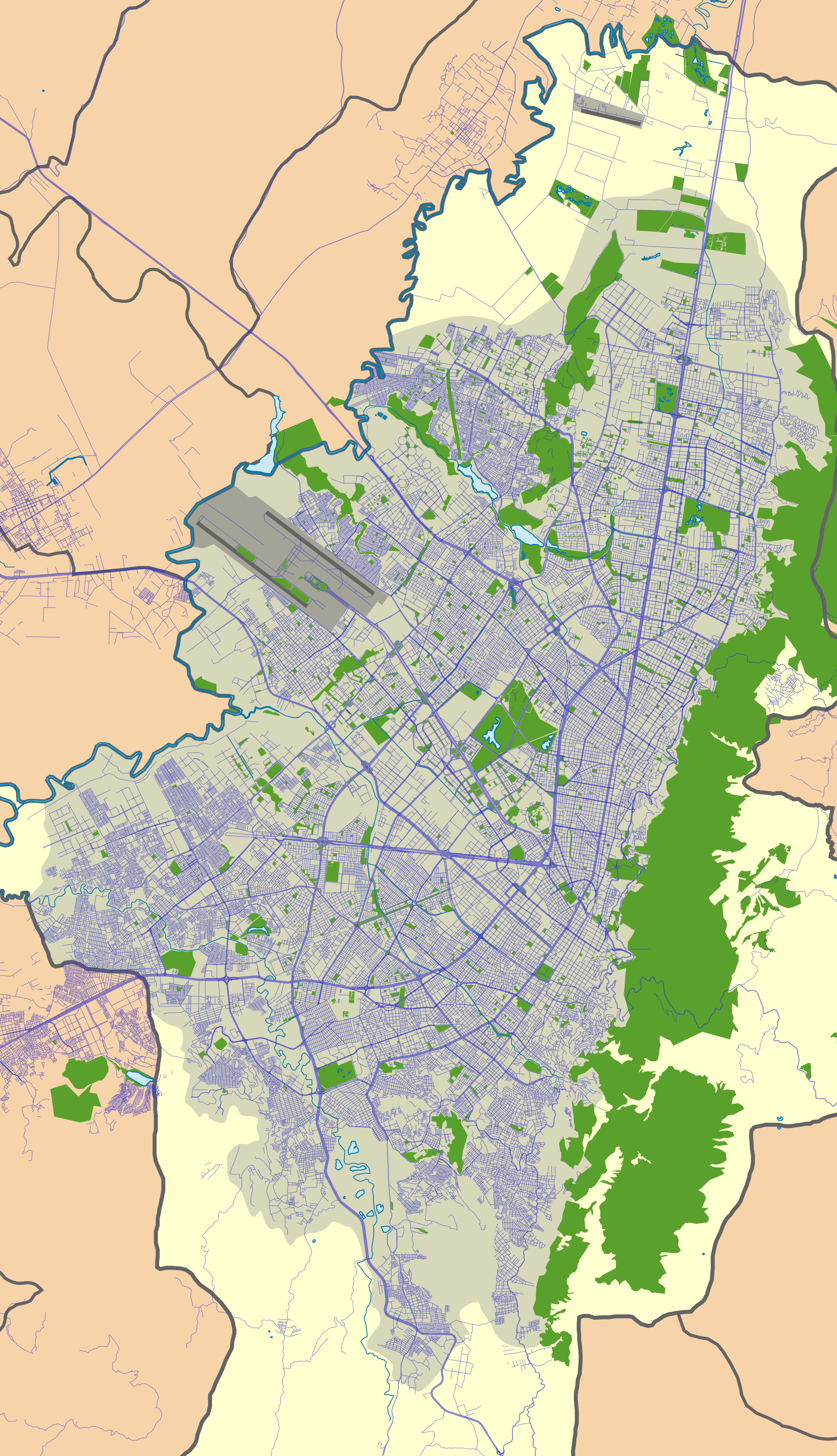
Torca within the Torca River basin

== See also ==
- List of rivers of Colombia
- Eastern Hills, Bogotá
- Bogotá savanna
- Fucha River, Juan Amarillo River, Tunjuelo River
