= Sailing at the 2011 Pan American Games – Qualification =

== Qualification rules ==
A nation may earn up to 1 boat in each of the 9 Sailing events.

== Qualification Timeline ==
Event	Date	Location
2009 South American Lightning Championship	December 2–7, 2009	(Chile) Concepción
2010 South American Sunfish Championship	January 14–17, 2010	(Colombia) Tominé
2010 Miami Olympic Classes Regatta	January 24–30, 2010	(United States) Miami
2010 J/24 Midwinter Championship	February 6–10, 2010	(United States) Tampa
2010 South American RS-X Championship	February 10–16, 2010	(Uruguay) Buceo (Montevideo)
2010 Central/South American Laser Championship	March 6–14, 2010	(Brazil) Florianópolis
2010 South American Hobie 16 Championship	March - April, 2010	(Brazil) Porto Alegre
2010 Sunfish Midwinter Championship	March 11–14, 2010	(United States) Sarasota
2010 Lightning Southern Circuit	March 13–21, 2010	(United States) Miami (United States) Savannah (United States) St. Petersburg
2010 North American J/24 Championship	May 19–23, 2010	(United States) Seattle
2010 North American Snipe Championship	July 1–4, 2010	(Puerto Rico) Ponce
2010 North American Lightning Championship	August 9–13, 2010	(United States) Toms River
2010 Snipe Western Hemisphere & Orient Championship	August 28 - September 3, 2010	(Canada) Ridgeway
2010 North American Hobie 16 Championship	October 11–15, 2010	(United States) Lake Mohave
2010 South American J/24 Championship	November 15–20, 2010	(Peru) La Punta
2010 South American Snipe Championship	November 21–27, 2010	(Chile) Algarrobo
2010 South American Sunfish Championship #2	November 23–27, 2010	(Peru) Paracas
2010 South American Lightning Championship	December 4–7, 2010	(Ecuador) Salinas
2011 Miami Olympic Classes Regatta	January 23–29, 2011	(United States) Miami
2011 North American RS-X Championship	February 17–20, 2011	(Mexico) Cozumel
2011 Sunfish Midwinter Championship	March 17–19, 2011	(United States) Fort Walton
2011 Sunfish World Championship	June 12–19, 2011	(Curaçao) Willemstad

== Summary ==
Qualification is official as of March 10, 2011 from the Pan American sailing website.

Nation	Men		Women		Open					Total	
Nation	Sailboard	Laser	Sailboard	Laser Radial	Sunfish	Snipe	Lightning	Hobie 16	J/24	Boats	Athletes
Argentina	X	X	X	X	X	X	X	X	X	9	16
Bermuda					X					1	1
Brazil	X	X	X	X	X	X	X	X	X	9	16
Canada	X	X	X	X			X	X	X	7	13
Chile		X		X	X	X	X		X	6	12
Colombia	X	X			X	X				4	5
Cuba	X		X			X				3	4
Dominican Republic		X								1	1
Ecuador				X		X	X			3	6
Guatemala		X		X	X			X		4	5
Mexico	X	X	X	X	X	X	X	X	X	9	16
Netherlands Antilles			X	X	X					3	3
Peru	X			X	X				X	4	7
Puerto Rico	X				X	X		X		4	6
Trinidad and Tobago		X								1	1
United States	X	X	X	X	X	X	X	X	X	9	16
Uruguay		X		X		X				3	4
Venezuela	X	X		X	X			X		5	6
Virgin Islands		X		X						2	2
Total: 19 NOCs	10	13	7	13	12	10	7	8	7	87	140

== Men's Sailboard ==
#	Nation	Qualification Tournament	Sailor
1	Mexico	Host Country	
2	Argentina	2010 Miami Regatta	
3	Canada	2010 Miami Regatta	
4	Colombia	2010 Miami Regatta	
5	United States	2010 Miami Regatta	
6	Venezuela	2010 South American Championship	
7	Brazil	2011 Miami Regatta	
8	Puerto Rico	2011 Miami Regatta	
-	~~Bermuda~~	2011 Miami Regatta	
~~10~~	~~Not used~~	~~2011 Miami Regatta~~	~~-~~
9	Cuba	2011 North American Championship	
10	Peru	2011 North American Championship	

- Unused quota spot transferred to the women's laser radial.

== Men's Laser ==
#	Nation	Qualification Tournament	Sailor
1	Mexico	Host Country	
2	Brazil	2010 Miami Regatta	
3	Canada	2010 Miami Regatta	
4	Chile	2010 Miami Regatta	
5	United States	2010 Miami Regatta	
6	Argentina	2010 Central/South American Championship	
7	Dominican Republic	2010 Central/South American Championship	
8	Guatemala	2010 Central/South American Championship	
9	Venezuela	2010 Central/South American Championship	
10	Trinidad and Tobago	2011 Miami Regatta	
11	Uruguay	2011 Miami Regatta	
12	Virgin Islands	2011 Miami Regatta	
12	Colombia	Wildcard	

== Women's Sailboard ==
#	Nation	Qualification Tournament	Sailor
1	Mexico	Host Country	
2	Canada	2010 Miami Regatta	
3	United States	2010 Miami Regatta	
4	Argentina	2010 South American Championship	
5	Brazil	2011 Miami Regatta	
6	Netherlands Antilles	2011 North American Championship	
7	Cuba	2011 North American Championship	

== Women's Laser Radial ==
#	Nation	Qualification Tournament	Sailor
1	Mexico	Host Country	
2	Argentina	2010 Miami Regatta	
3	Canada	2010 Miami Regatta	
4	United States	2010 Miami Regatta	
5	Venezuela	2010 Miami Regatta	
6	Brazil	2010 Central/South American Championship	
7	Ecuador	2010 Central/South American Championship	
8	Peru	2010 Central/South American Championship	
9	Uruguay	2010 Central/South American Championship	
10	(International Olympic Committee) Netherlands Antilles	2011 Miami Regatta	
11	Guatemala	2011 Miami Regatta	
12	Virgin Islands	2011 Miami Regatta	
13	Chile	Wildcard	

== Open Sunfish ==
#	Nation	Qualification Tournament	Sailor
1	Mexico	Host Country	
2	Argentina	2010 South American Championship	
3	United States	2010 Mid Winters	
4	Venezuela	2010 Mid Winters	
5	Brazil	2010 South American Championship #2	
6	Chile	2010 South American Championship #2	
7	Peru	2010 South American Championship #2	
8	Puerto Rico	2011 Mid Winters	
9	Guatemala	2011 Mid Winters	
10	Colombia	2011 Mid Winters	
11	Bermuda	2011 Worlds	
12	(International Olympic Committee) Netherlands Antilles	2011 Worlds	

== Open Snipe ==
#	Nation	Qualification Tournament	Sailors
1	Mexico	Host Country	
2	Argentina	2010 Western/Oriental Championship	
3	Brazil	2010 Western/Oriental Championship	
4	Cuba	2010 Western/Oriental Championship	
5	Uruguay	2010 Western/Oriental Championship	
6	Puerto Rico	2010 North American Championship	
7	United States	2010 North American Championship	
8	Chile	2010 South American Championship	
9	Colombia	2010 South American Championship	
10	Ecuador	2010 South American Championship	

== Open Lightning ==
#	Nation	Qualification Tournament	Sailors
1	Mexico	Host Country	
2	Brazil	2009 South American Championship	
3	Chile	2009 South American Championship	
4	United States	2010 Southern Circuit	
5	Canada	2010 North American Championship	
6	Ecuador	2010 North American Championship	
7	Argentina	2010 South American Championship	

== Open Hobie 16 ==
#	Nation	Qualification Tournament	Sailors
1	Mexico	Host Country	
2	Argentina	2010 South American Championship	
3	Brazil	2010 South American Championship	
4	Venezuela	2010 South American Championship	
5	Canada	2010 North American Championship	
6	Guatemala	2010 North American Championship	
7	Puerto Rico	2010 North American Championship	
8	United States	2010 North American Championship	

== Open J/24 ==
#	Nation	Qualification Tournament	Sailors
1	Mexico	Host Country	
2	Argentina	2010 North American Championship	
3	United States	2010 North American Championship	
4	Brazil	2010 South American Championship	
5	Chile	2010 South American Championship	
6	Peru	2010 South American Championship	
7	Canada	Mid-Winters	
