= Guaymaral y Torca =

Guaymaral y Torca Humedal Guaymaral y Torca
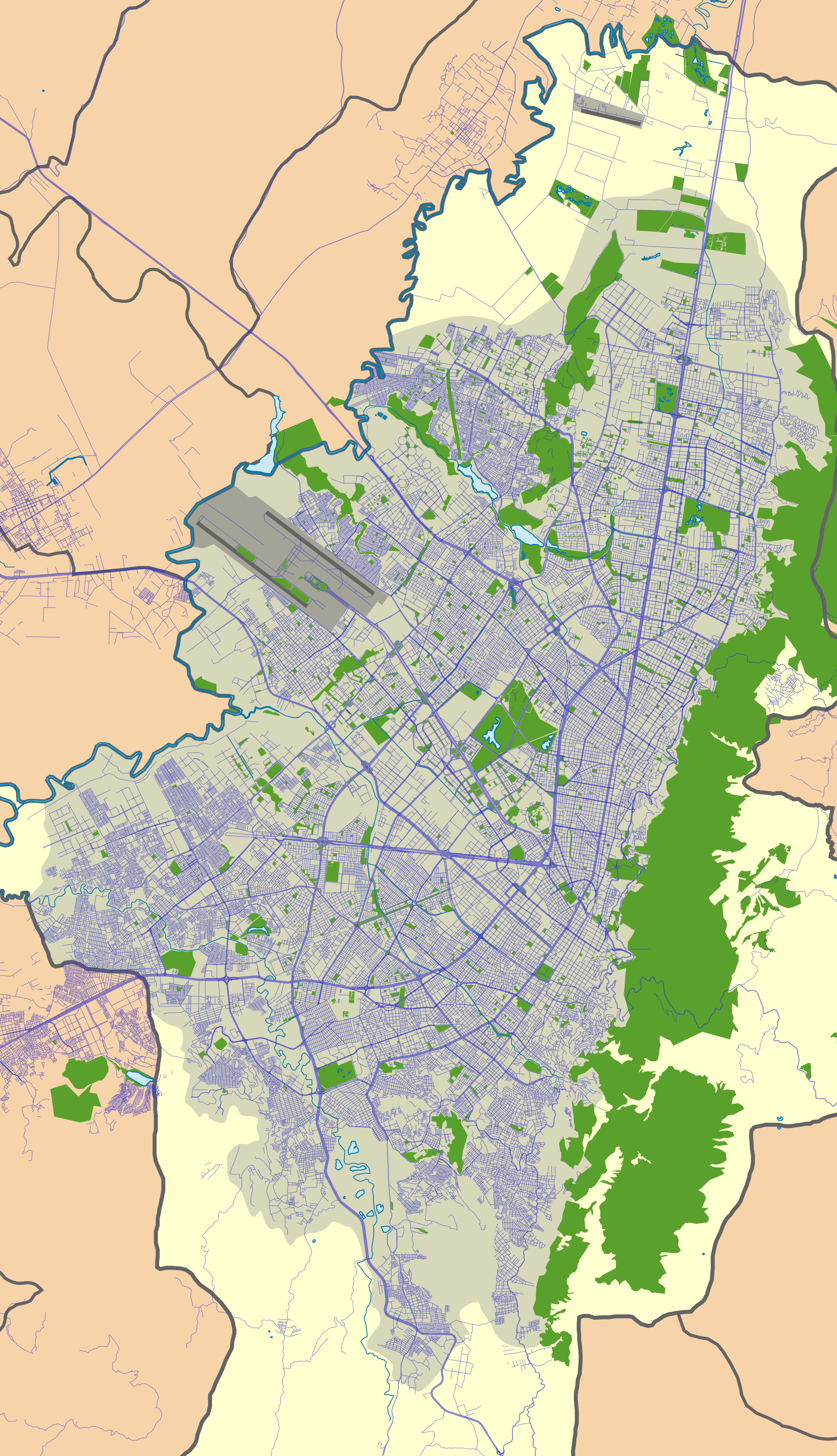
- Location within Bogotá
- Location: Suba & Usaquén, Bogotá; Colombia
- Coordinates: 4°48′17.7″N 74°02′27.8″W
- Area: 73 ha (180 acres)
- Elevation: 2,547 m (8,356 ft)
- Designated: September 2003
- Named for: Chibcha: Guaimaro, Torca
- Administrator: EAAB - ESP

Guaymaral y Torca (Spanish: Humedal Guaymaral y Torca) is a combined wetland, part of the Wetlands of Bogotá, located in the north of the Colombian capital in the localities Suba and Usaquén, Bogotá, Colombia. The wetlands on the Bogotá savanna cover an area of about 73 hectares (180 acres). Guaymaral y Torca, the northernmost wetlands of Bogotá at the foot of the Eastern Hills, is composed of three parts, Guaymaral in the west in Suba (49 hectares (120 acres)), Torca in the east in Usaquén (24 hectares (59 acres)) and a small strip along the dividing Autopista Norte between the two main wetlands. The wetlands are located in the Torca River basin. The Autopista Norte was constructed in 1952, dividing the wetlands.

== Etymology ==
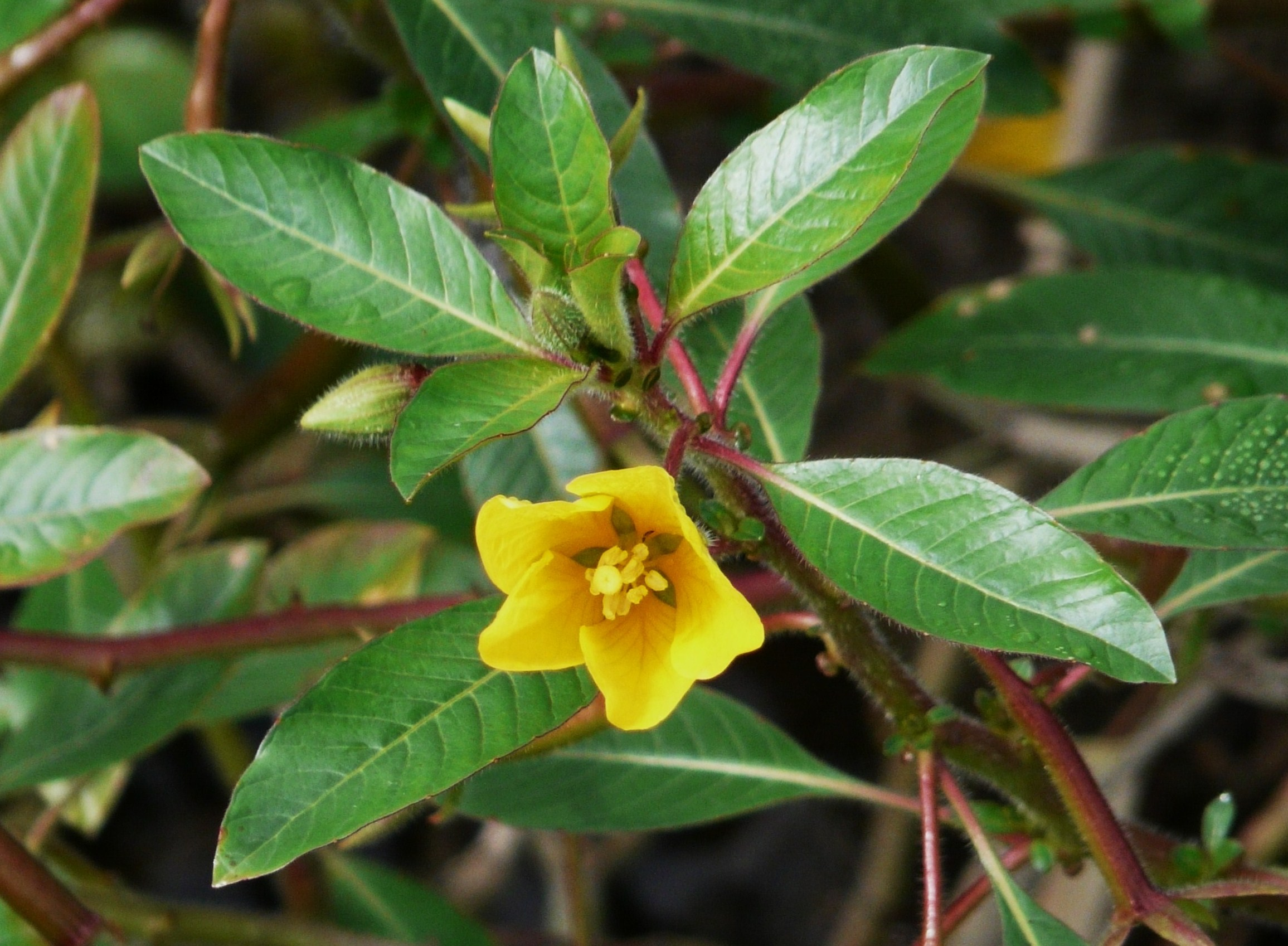
Ludwigia peploides

The word Guaymaral is derived from the Chibcha name for Brosimum utile, guaimaro, cultivated by the indigenous people in the Valle de Upár and the Muzo. Torca is named after the Torca River.

== Flora and fauna ==
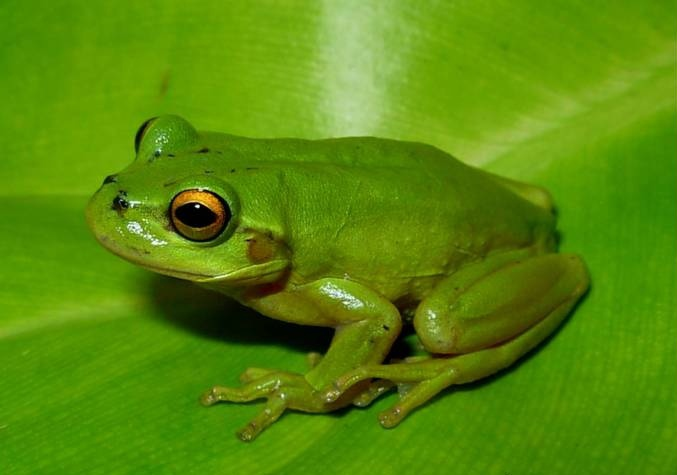
Green dotted treefrog

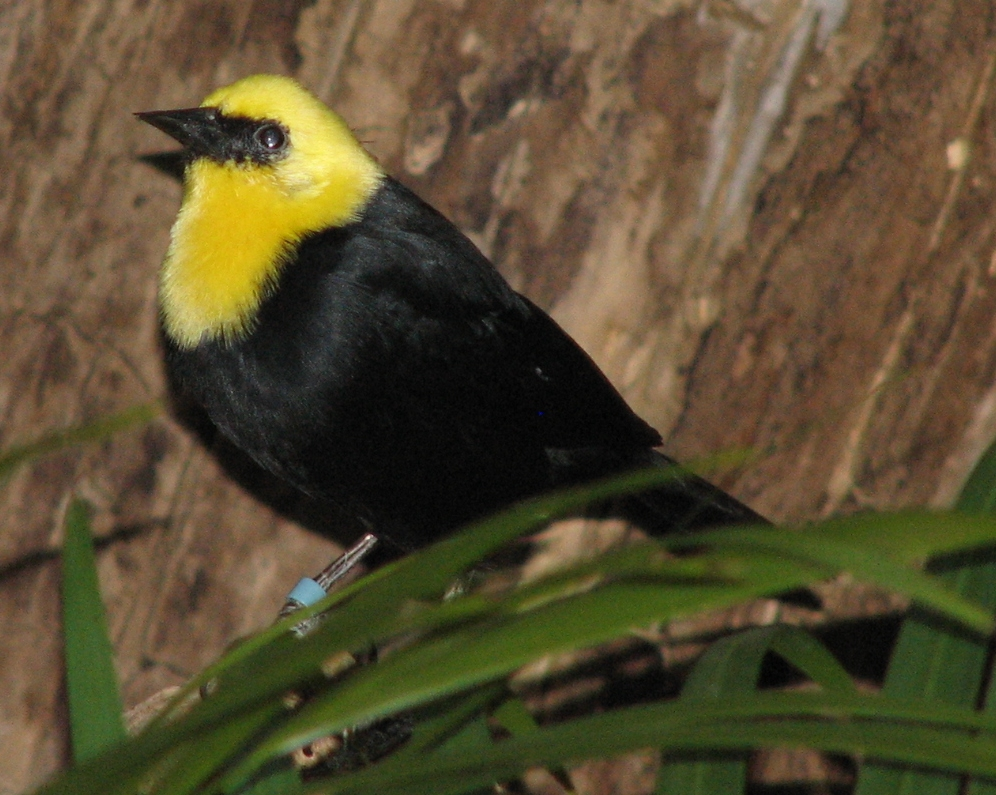
Yellow-hooded blackbird

=== Flora ===
Flora registered in Guaymaral y Torca are among others Pennisetum clandestinum, Salix humboldtiana, Ulex europaeus, Schonoplectus californicus, Galium ascendens, Bidens laevis, Ludwigia peploides, Azolla filiculoides, Holcus lanatus, Eichhornia crassipe, Typha domingensis, Rumex conglomeratus, Alnus acuminata, Baccharis cf. latifolia, Polygonum sp., Eleocharis sp., Carex sp., Rubus sp., Cuphea sp.. Also Hydrocotyle ranunculoides, Lemna minor, Typha latifolia and Juncus bogotensis have been noted.

=== Fauna ===
Mammals

A mammal present in the wetland is the Bogotá savanna guinea pig species Cavia anolaimae.

Amphibians

Amphibians registered are among others the green dotted treefrog (Hyla labialis) and the cream-backed poison frog (Colostethus subpunctatus).

Birds

In Guaymaral, 43 and in Torca 24 bird species have been registered.

Birds spotted are among others the saffron finch (Sicalis flaveola), yellow-billed cuckoo (Coccyzus americanus), and yellow-hooded blackbird (Chrysomus icterocephalus bogotensis).

== See also ==
- Biodiversity of Colombia, Bogotá savanna, Thomas van der Hammen Natural Reserve
- Wetlands of Bogotá
