= Lake Guatavita =

Lake in Cundinamarca Department, Colombia

Laguna Guatavita
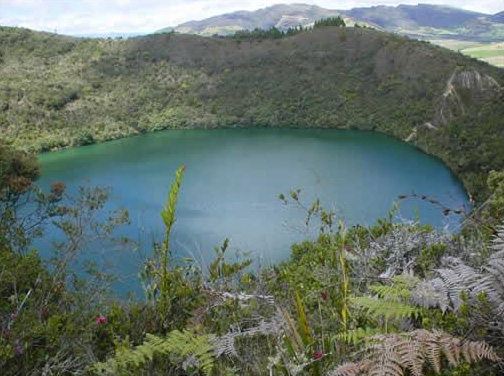

- Location within Colombia
- Location: Sesquilé, Cundinamarca, Colombia
- Coordinates: 4°58′39″N 73°46′30″W
- Max. length: 700 m (2,300 ft)
- Max. width: 700 m (2,300 ft)
- Surface area: 19.8 ha (49 acres)
- Max. depth: 125 m (410 ft)
- Surface elevation: 3,000 m (9,800 ft)

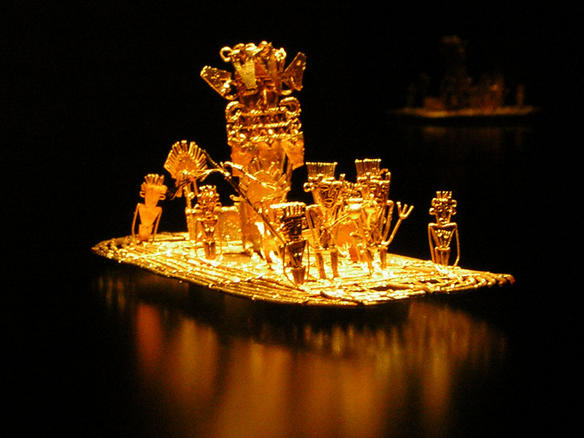
The zipa used to cover his body in gold dust, and from his raft, he offered treasures to the Guatavita goddess in the middle of the sacred lake. This Muisca tradition became the origin of the legend of El Dorado. Muisca raft in the Gold Museum, Bogotá, Colombia

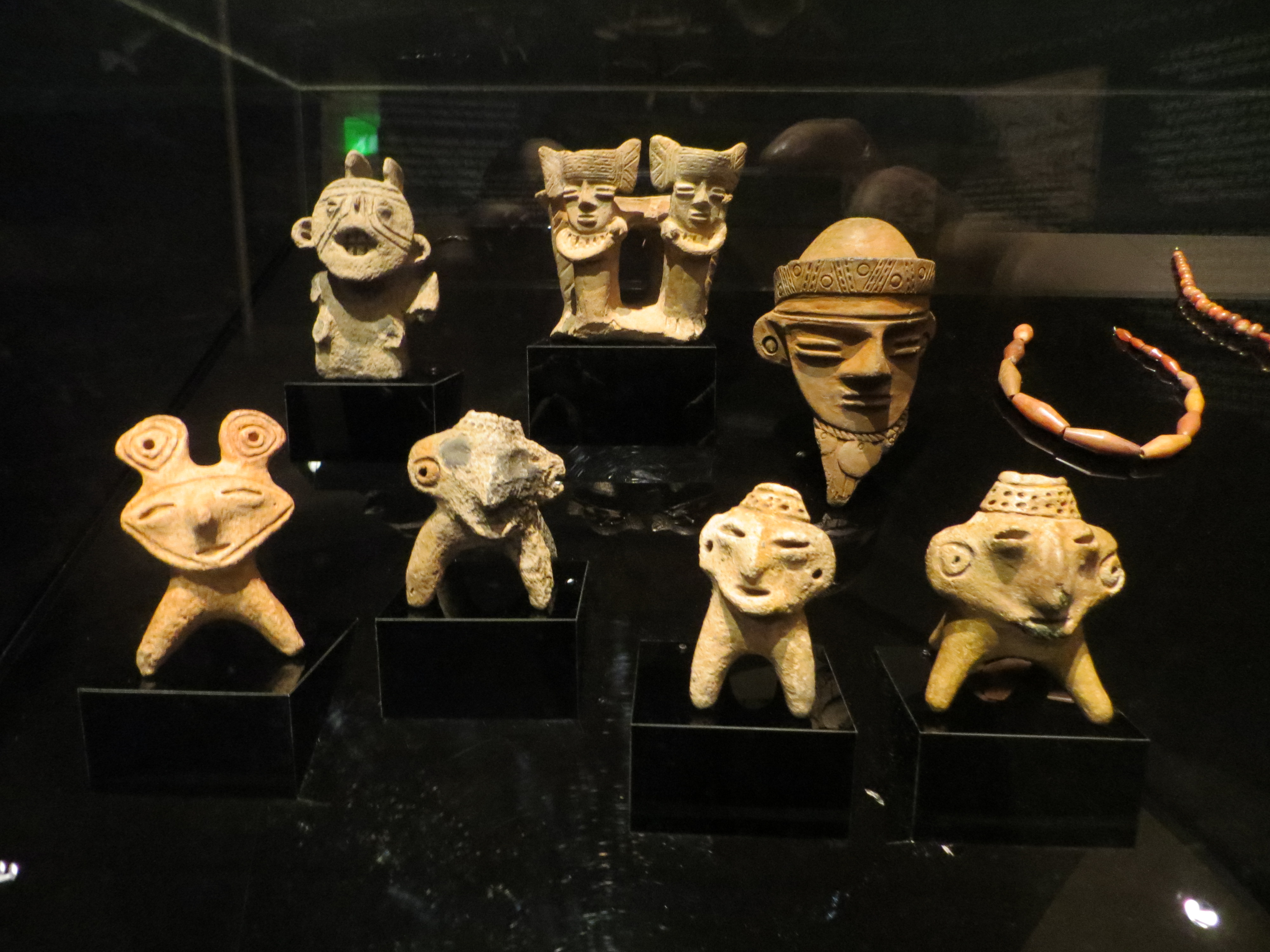
Votive objects found at the bottom of Lake Guatavita. British Museum

Lake Guatavita (Spanish: Laguna Guatavita) is located in the Cordillera Oriental of the Colombian Andes in the municipality of Sesquilé in the Almeidas Province, Cundinamarca department of Colombia, 57 km (35 mi) northeast of Bogotá, the capital of Colombia. This lake is famous for being the inspiration for the legendary El Dorado.

The lake is circular and has a surface area of 19.8 hectares (49 acres). The earlier theories of the crater's origin being a meteorite impact, volcanic cinder, or limestone sinkhole are now discredited. The most likely explanation is that it resulted from the dissolution of underground salt deposits from an anticline, resulting in a kind of sinkhole.

There are hot springs nearby in the municipality of Sesquilé, which means "hot water" in the now-extinct language of Chibcha, once spoken by the local indigenous people, the Muisca.

Spanish colonizers and Conquistadors knew about the existence of a sacred lake in the Eastern Ranges of the Andes possibly as early as 1531. The lake was associated with indigenous rituals involving gold. However, the first conquistador to arrive at the actual location was Gonzalo Jiménez de Quesada, possibly in June 1537, while on an expedition to the highlands of the Eastern Ranges of the Andes in search of gold. This brought the Spanish into first contact with the Muisca inhabiting the Altiplano Cundiboyacense, including around Lake Guatavita.

The lake is a focus of ecotourism, and its association with the legend of El Dorado is also a major attraction.

== Etymology ==
The name of the lake is derived from muyscubun, the language of the Muisca: gwa: mountain or gwata, gwate: high elevation, or gwatibita: high mountain peak; hence, a pool at a high mountain peak. Another meaning is "End of the farmfields".

== Muisca mythology ==
Lake Guatavita was reputedly one of the sacred lakes of the Muisca, and a ritual conducted there is widely thought to be the basis for the legend of El Dorado, "the golden one". The legend says the lake is where the Muisca celebrated a ritual in which the zipa (named "El Dorado" by the conquistadors) was covered in gold dust, and then, venturing out into the water on a ceremonial raft made of rushes, dove into the waters, washing off the gold. Afterward, trinkets, jewelry, and other precious offerings were thrown into the waters by worshipers. A few artifacts of gold and silver found at bottom hold proof to this claim; however, to date, attempts to drain the lake or salvage the gold (see Lake Guatavita gold) have yielded no more than these.

== In pop culture ==
- Lake Guatavita is the filming location of the music video of the song No Te Pido Flores by Fanny Lú.

== See also ==
- Muisca religion
- Guatavita myth
- Lake Iguaque, another sacred lake of the Muisca
- Sacred waters
- Siecha Lakes, other lakes implicated in the El Dorado legend
- Tominé Reservoir, which buried the old town of Guatavita
- Tunjo, offer pieces in Lake Guatavita
- Gold Museum, Bogotá, where archaeological objects from the lake are displayed
