= Sesquilé =

- Municipality and town
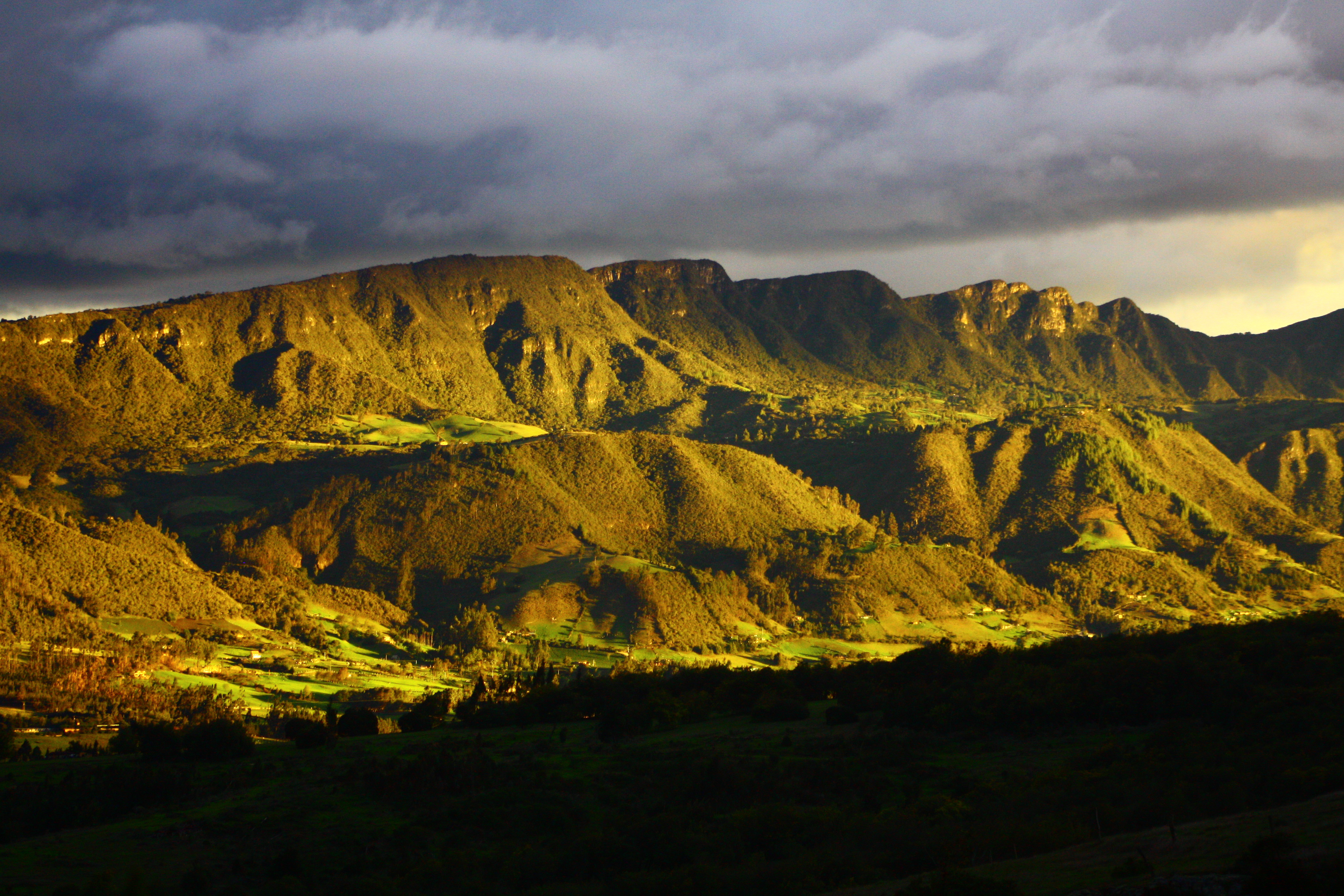
- View of Sesquilé

- Flag Seal

- Location of the municipality and town inside Cundinamarca Department of Colombia

- Location in Colombia
- Coordinates: 5°2′43″N 73°47′50″W
- Country: Colombia
- Department: Cundinamarca
- Province: Almeidas Province
- Founded: 12 October 1600

Government
  - Mayor: Nelson Uriel Robayo López (2016-2019)

Area
  - Municipality and town: 141 km^{2} (54 sq mi)
- Elevation: 2,595 m (8,514 ft)

Population (2015)
  - Municipality and town: 13,936
  - Density: 98.8/km^{2} (256/sq mi)
  - Urban: 3,468
- Time zone: UTC-5 (Colombia Standard Time)
- Website: Official website

Sesquilé is a town and municipality in Almeidas Province in the department of Cundinamarca, Colombia. Sesquilé in the Chibcha language of the Muisca means "hot water".

Sesquilé is adjacent to Tominé Reservoir and nearby Lake Guatavita, the suspected site of the El Dorado legend.

== Gallery ==
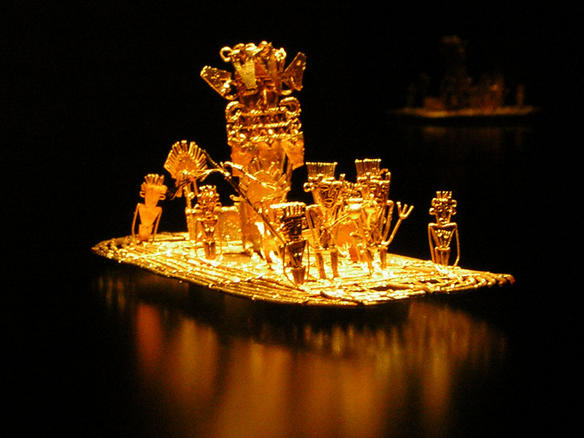
The Muisca raft represents the legend of El Dorado

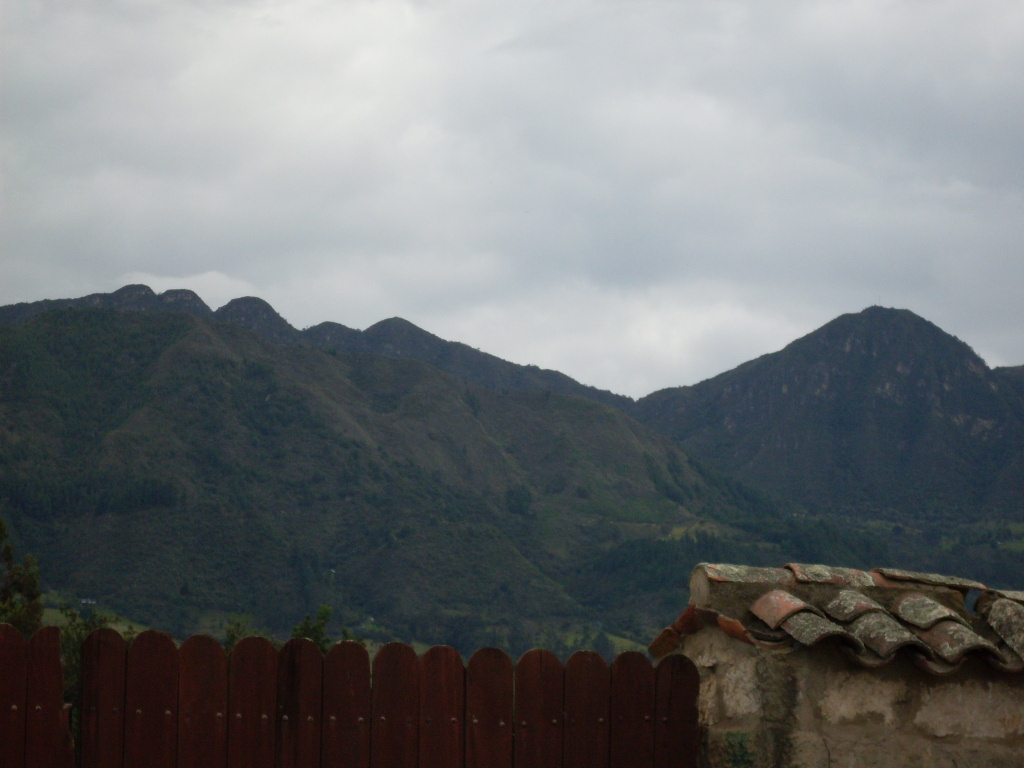
Las Tres Viejas (left) and Cerro de Covandonga (right)

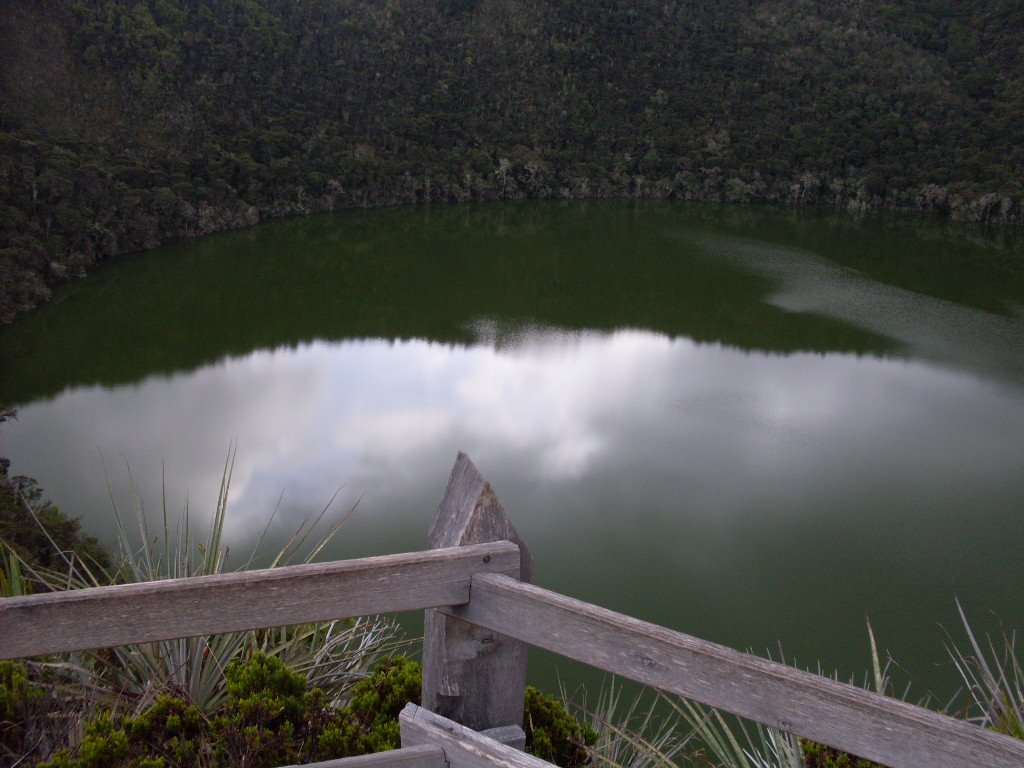
Lake Guatavita
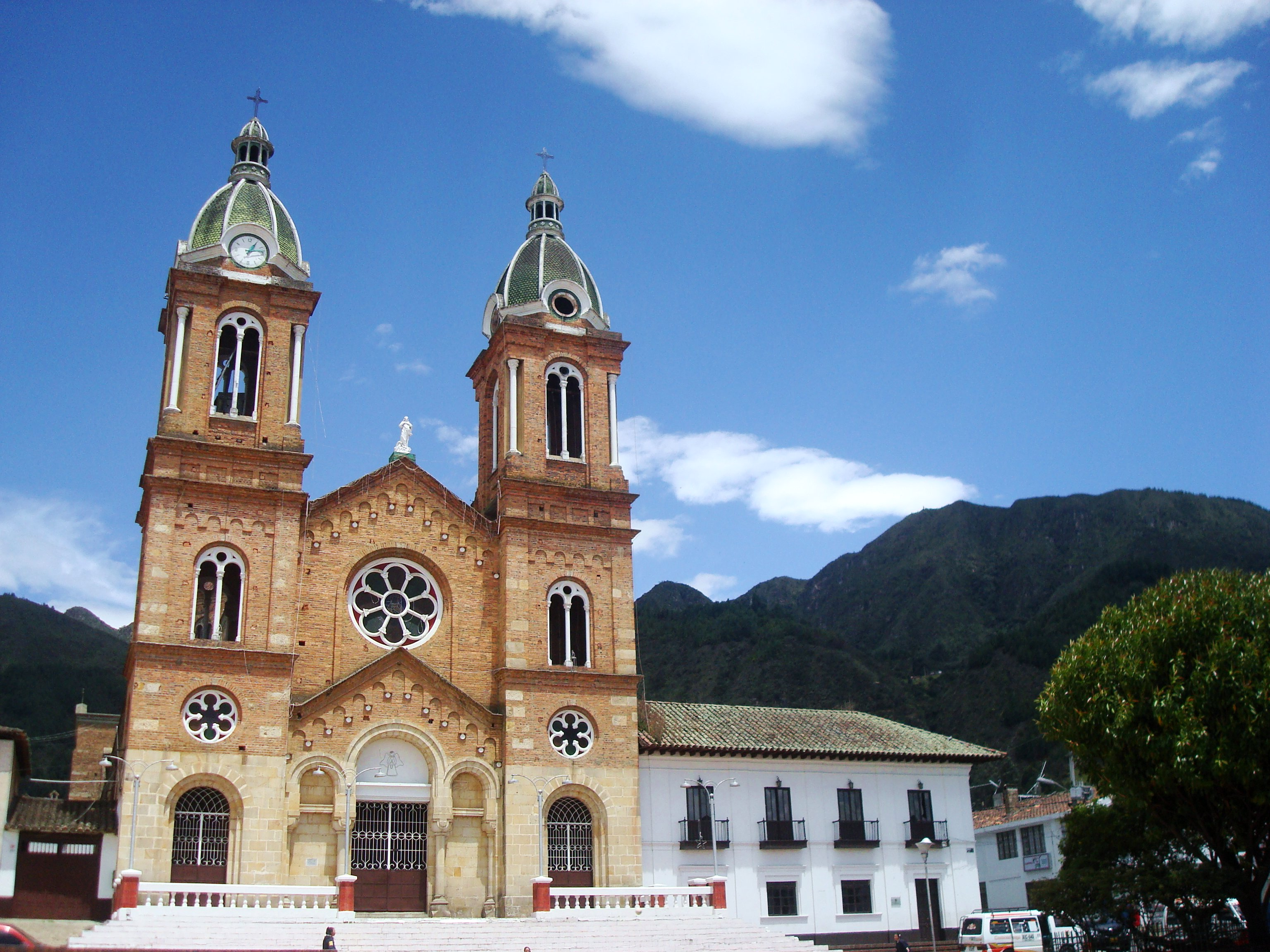
Church of Sesquilé

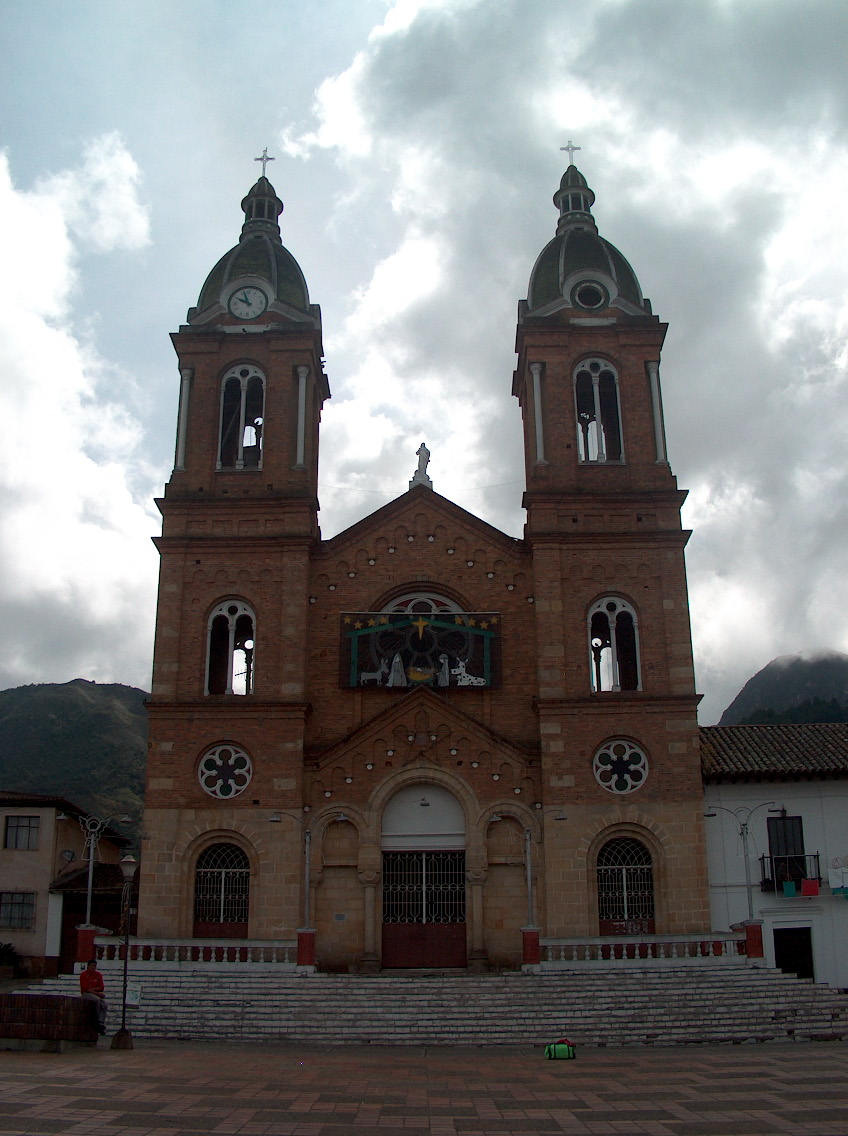
Church

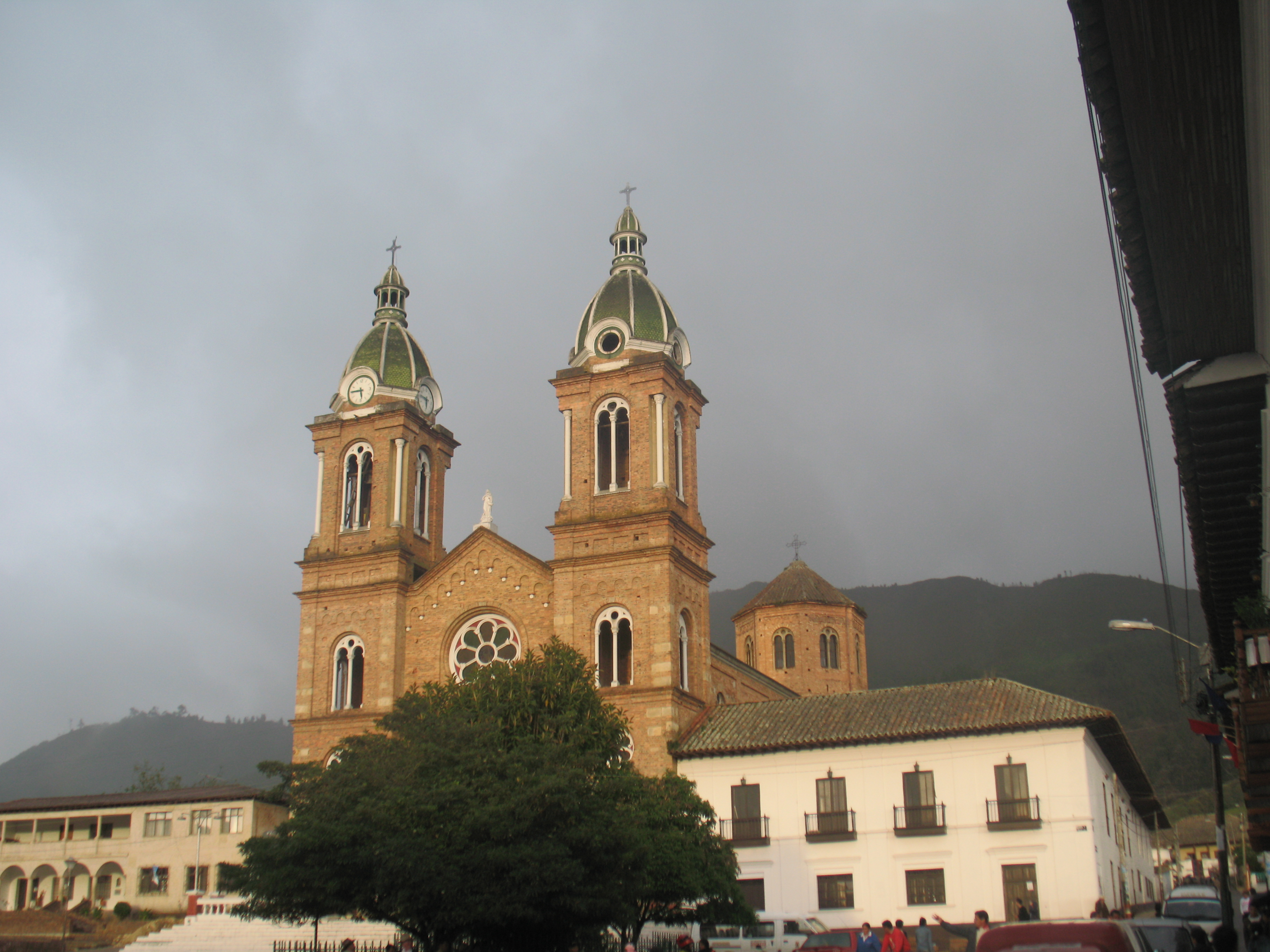
Church

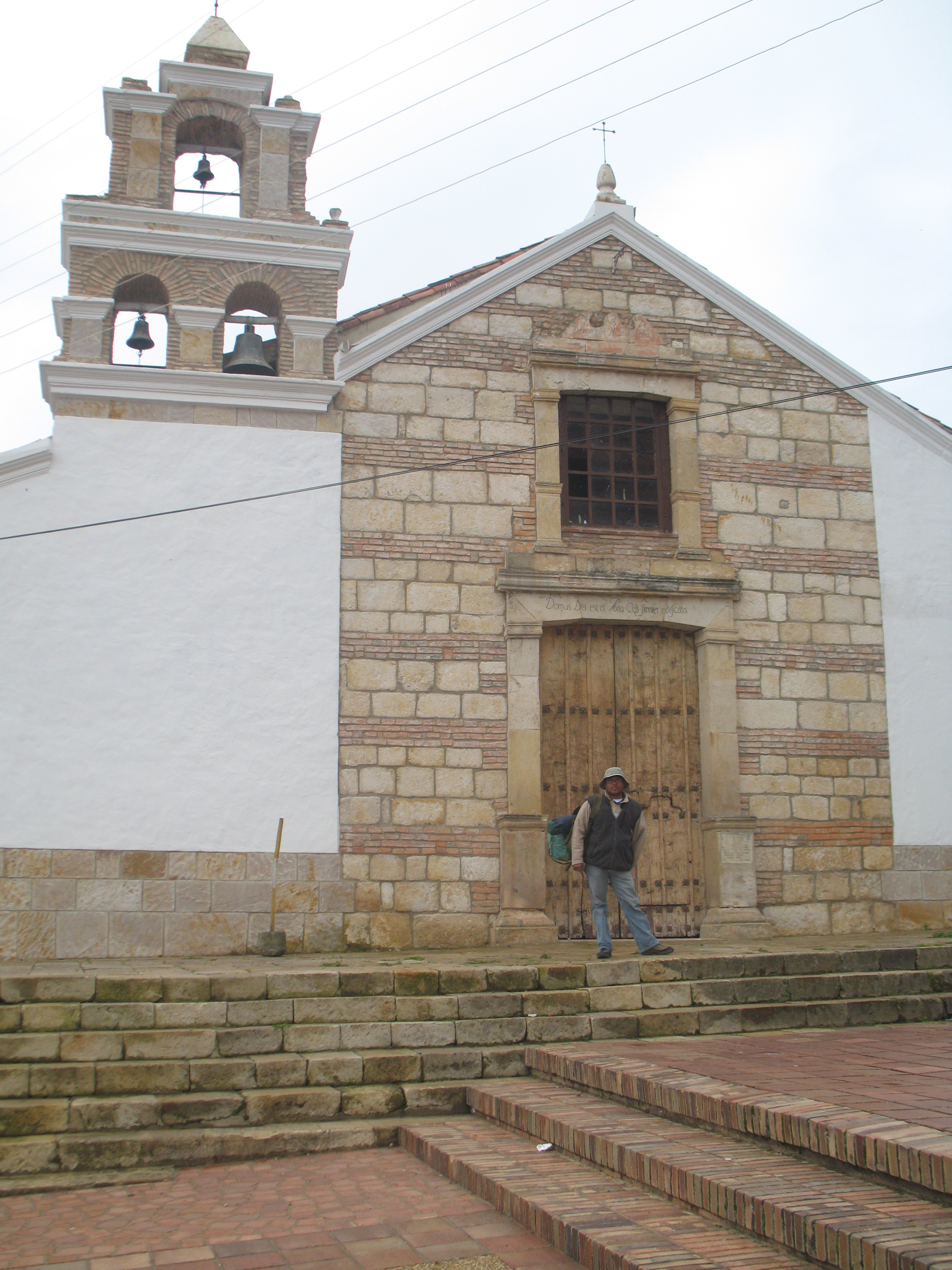
Colonial chapel
