= Tominé Reservoir =

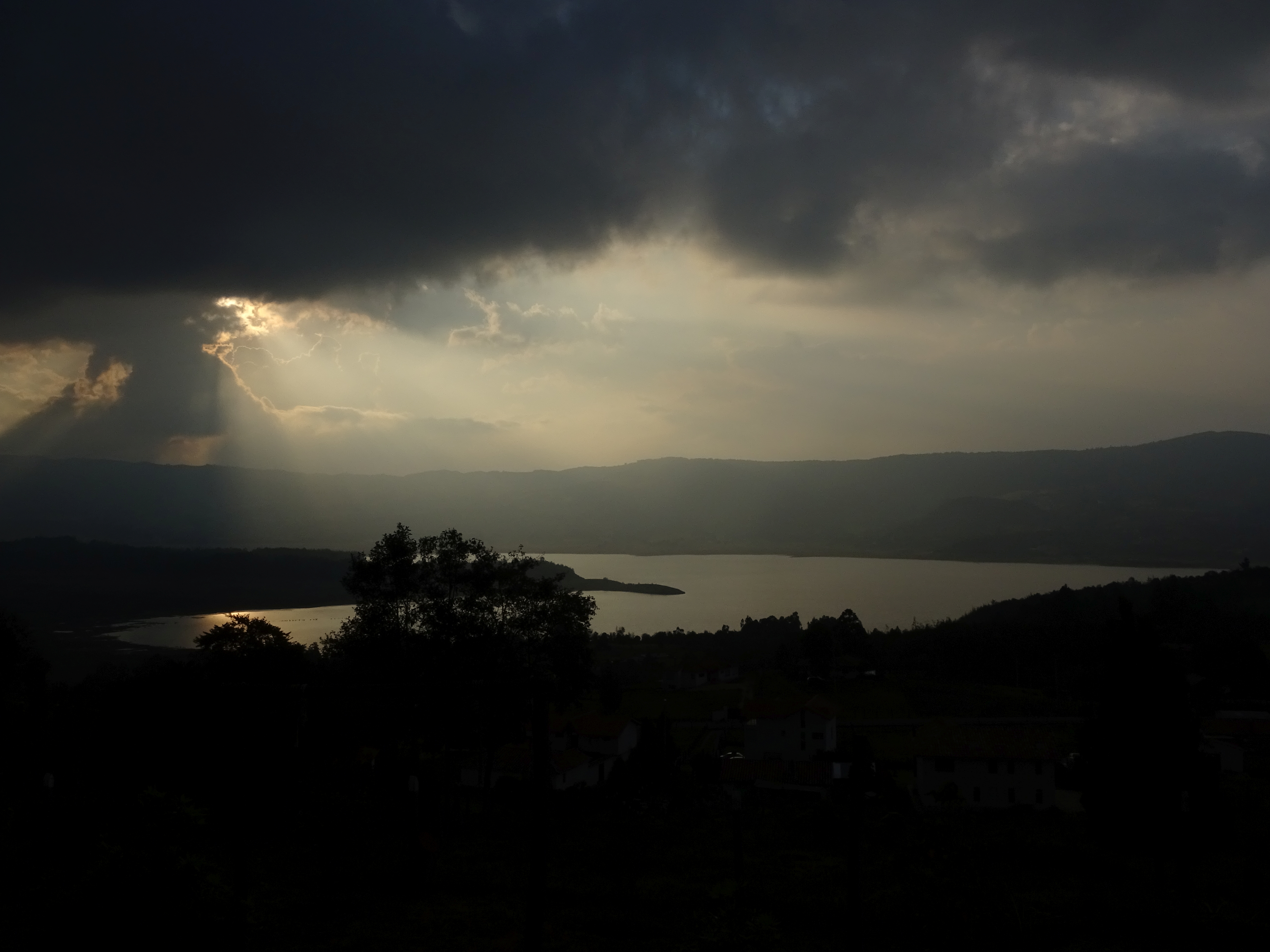
- Sunrays over Tominé Reservoir seen from Guatavita

- Location within Colombia
- Location: Guatavita & Sesquilé; Cundinamarca
- Coordinates: 4°57′51″N 73°49′51″W
- Type: Artificial lake
- Primary inflows: Bogotá River
- Primary outflows: Bogotá River
- Basin countries: Colombia
- Max. length: 18 km (11 mi)
- Max. width: 4 km (2.5 mi)
- Surface area: 72 km^{2} (28 sq mi)
- Max. depth: 38 m (125 ft)
- Water volume: 690 hm^{3} (2.4×10^{10} cu ft)
- Surface elevation: 2,581 m (8,468 ft)
- Islands: Various

The Tominé Reservoir (Spanish: Embalse del Tominé) is a reservoir in northern Cundinamarca, Colombia about 60 kilometres (37 mi) north of Bogotá. It is 18 kilometres (11 mi) long and 4 kilometres (2.5 mi) wide, and when completely filled reaches a maximum depth of 38 metres (125 ft). Its objectives are to control water levels for hydroelectric plants in the region and supply drinking water to Bogotá. It is adjacent to the municipalities of Sesquilé and Guatavita.

== History ==
The reservoir was completed in 1967. The town of Guatavita was intentionally flooded for the construction and functioning of the reservoir. Guatavita was rebuilt on higher grounds. Today, Tominé hosts water sports and other water-related events. The reservoir, the biggest on the Bogotá savanna, is seven times larger than the Neusa and Sisga Reservoirs. At lowstand lake levels, the top of the tower of the old obelisk of Guatavita is visible above the water level.

== Gallery ==
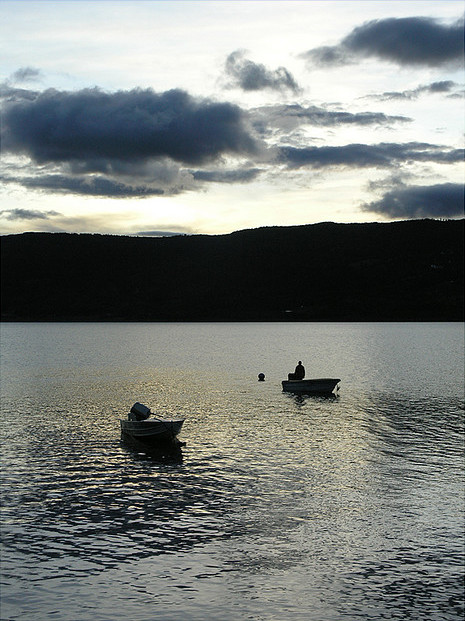
Fishing boats
September 2008

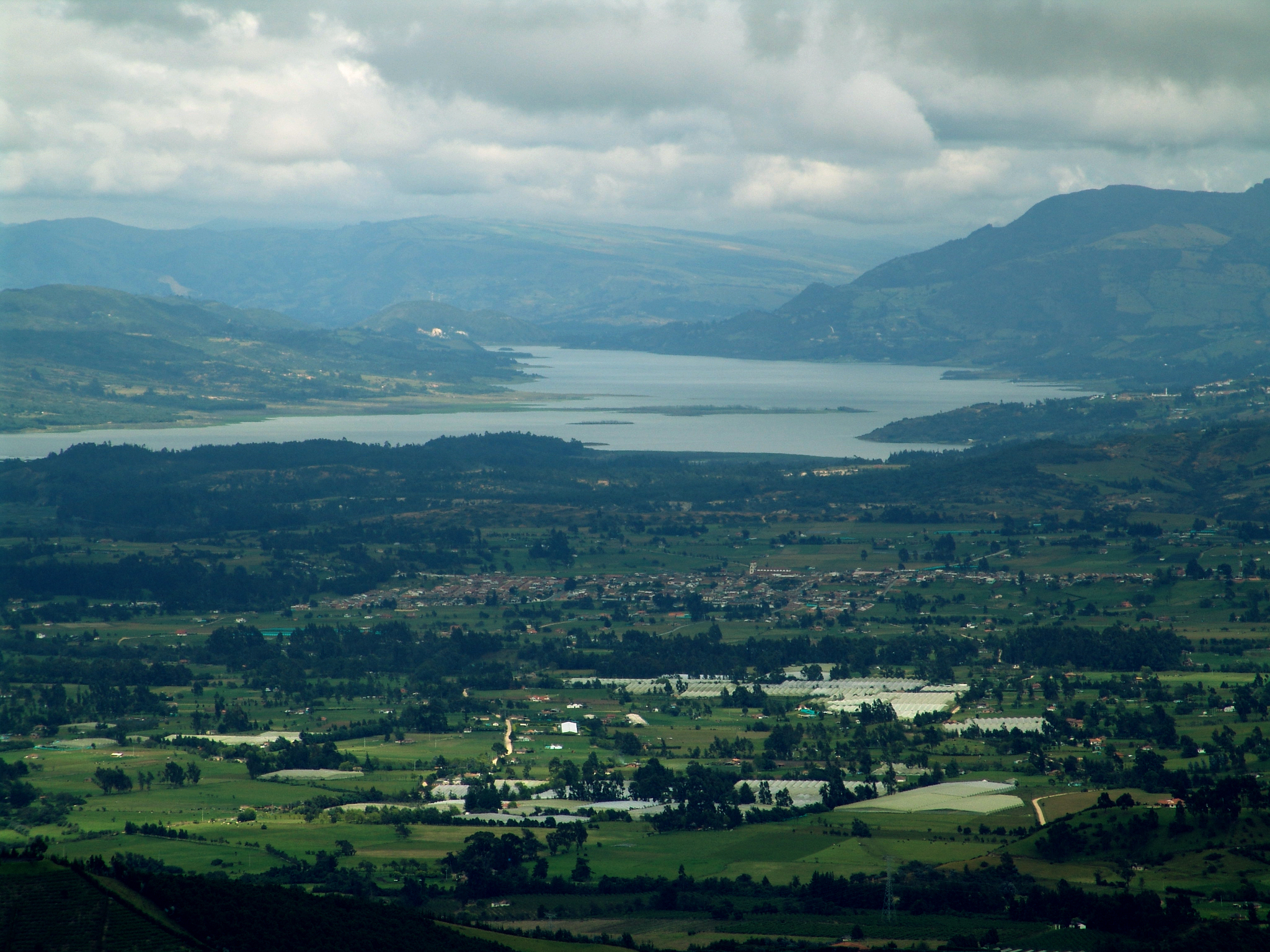
View of Tomine Reservoir
December 2008

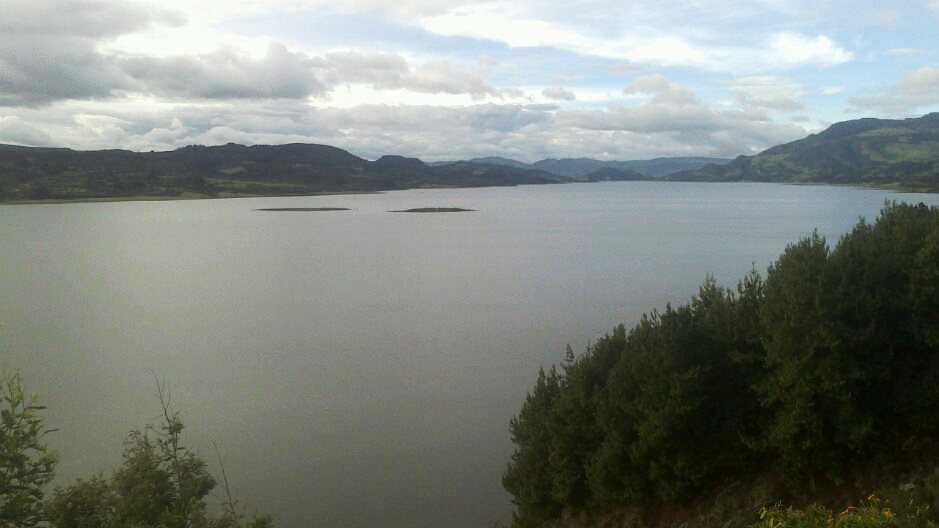
Tominé Reservoir
June 2013

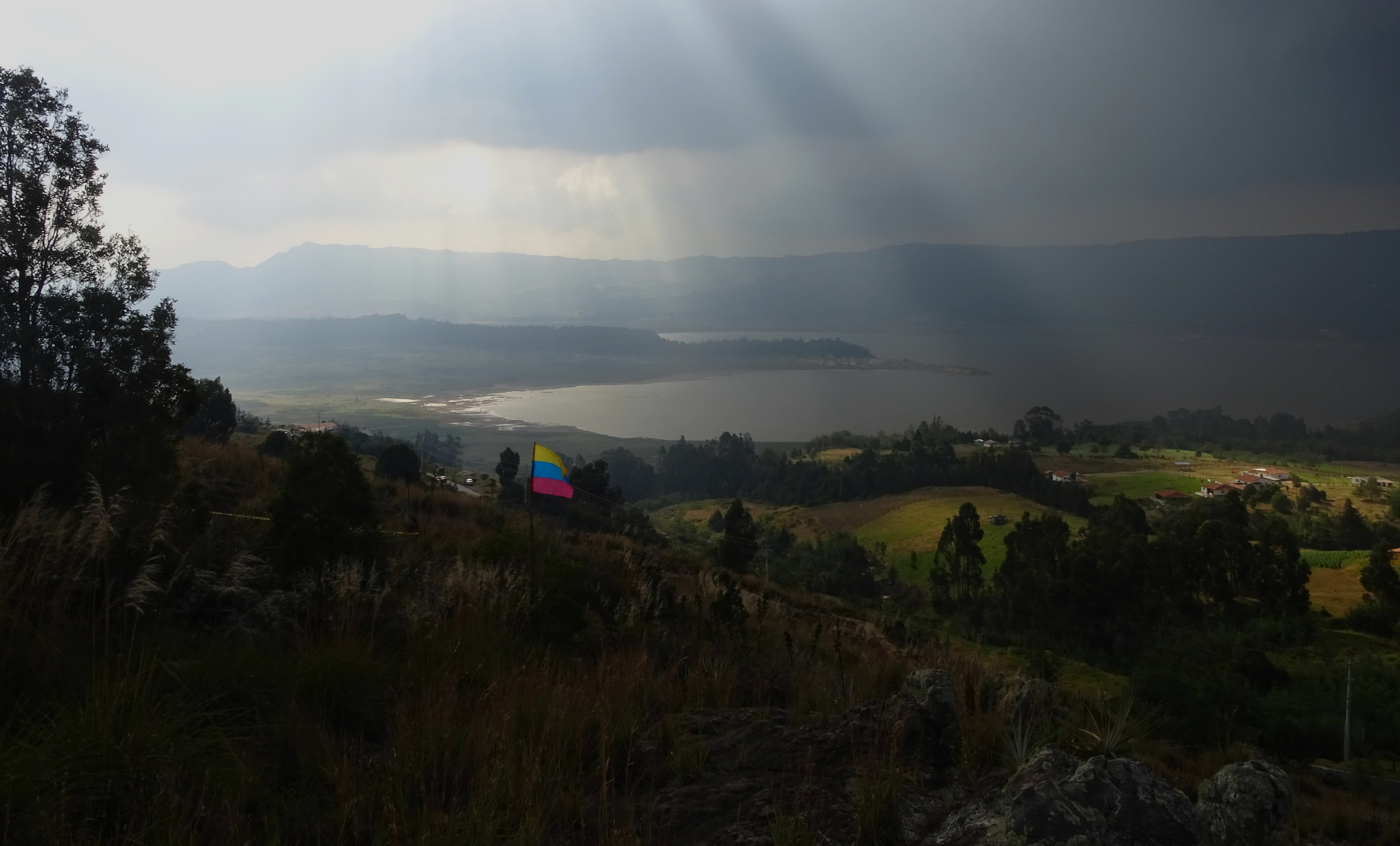
View of Tominé Reservoir
February 2017

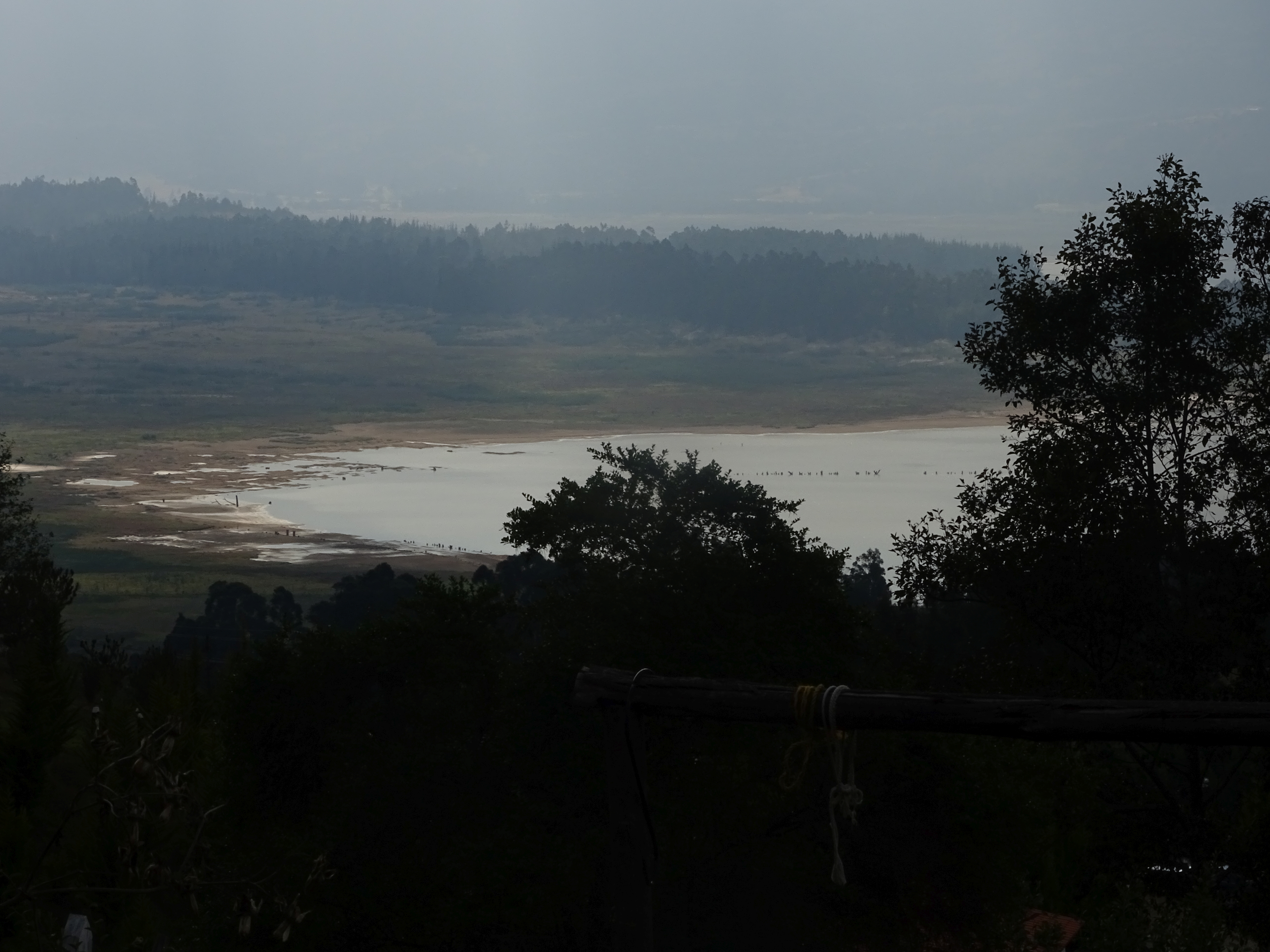
Lowstand of Tominé Reservoir
February 2017

=== Panoramas ===
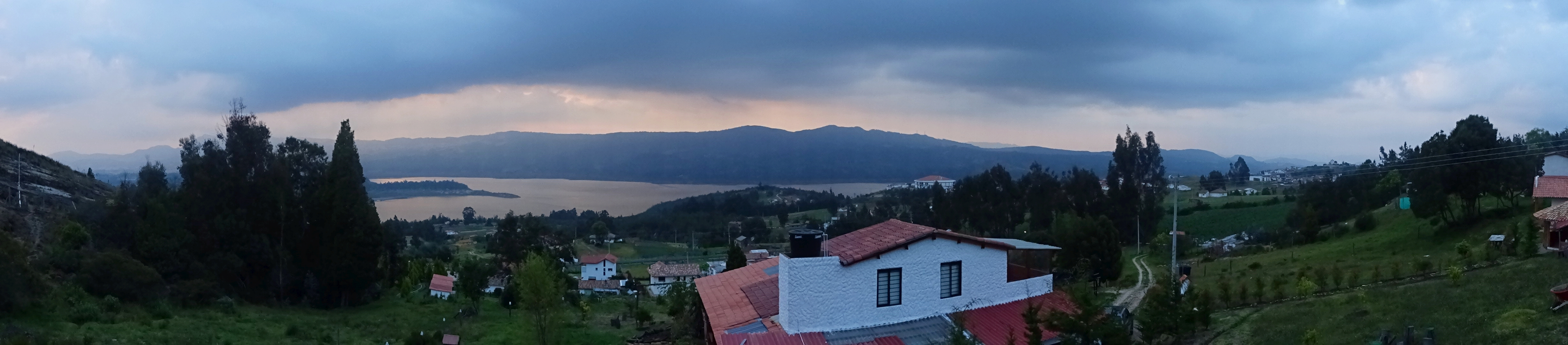
View of Tominé Reservoir from Guatavita
February 2017
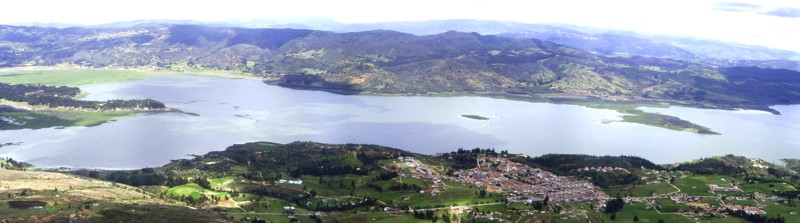
Aerial view of Tominé Reservoir
May 2007

== See also ==
- Lake Guatavita, Lake Suesca
