= Ramón Torres Méndez =

Colombian painter (1809–1885)

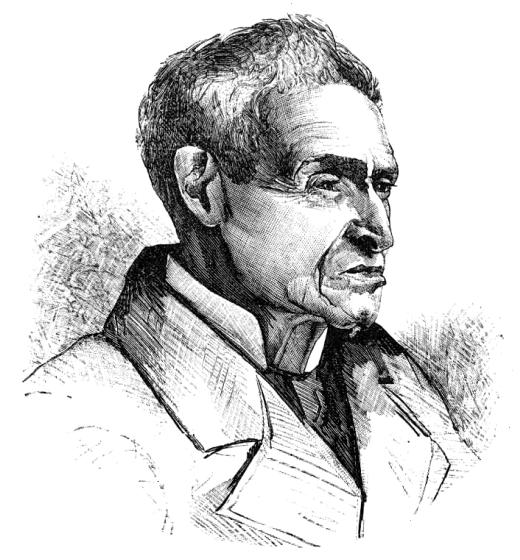
- Engraving of Ramón Torres Méndez in 1887
- Born: 29 August 1809; Bogotá, D.C., Viceroyalty of New Granada
- Died: 16 December 1885 (aged 76); Bogotá, D.C., Colombia
- Known for: Painting
- Movement: Costumbrismo
- Spouse: María Coleta Medina Morales (1840-)

Ramón Torres Méndez (29 August 1809 – 16 December 1885) was a Colombian painter and lithographer considered one of the most prolific and important costumbrismo artists of the 19th century in Colombia, best known for his genre works into everyday Colombian life documenting the costumes, occupations, and pastimes of the common people of his time.
