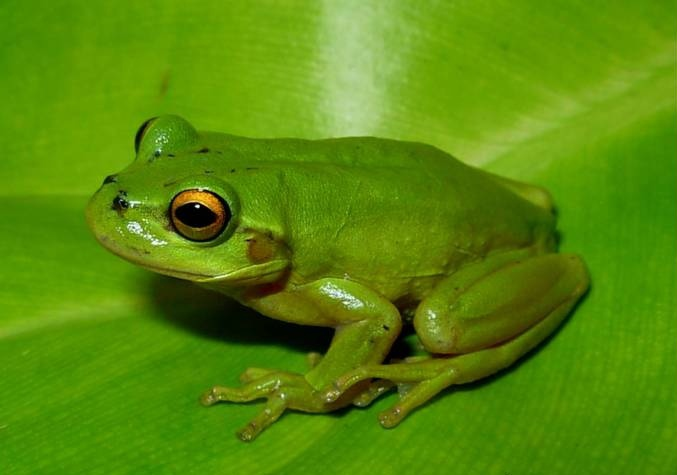

Conservation status
- Least Concern (IUCN 3.1)

Scientific classification
- Kingdom: Animalia
- Phylum: Chordata
- Class: Amphibia
- Order: Anura
- Family: Hylidae
- Genus: Dendropsophus
- Species: D. molitor

Binomial name
- Dendropsophus molitor (Schmidt, 1857)

Synonyms
- Dendropsophus labialis (Peters, 1863)

= Dendropsophus molitor =

Green dotted treefrog

Species of frog

Dendropsophus molitor is a species of frog in the family Hylidae, known commonly as the green dotted treefrog. It is endemic to Colombia. Its natural habitats are subtropical or tropical high-altitude shrubland, subtropical or tropical high-altitude grassland, shrub-dominated wetlands, swamps, freshwater marshes, intermittent freshwater marshes, pastureland, plantations, rural gardens, urban areas, irrigated land, and seasonally flooded agricultural land.
