= Río Frío (Bogotá savanna) =

River in Colombia

- Location of the Río Frío in Colombia
- Etymology: "Cold river"
- Native name: Río Frío (Spanish)

Location
- Country: Colombia
- Department: Cundinamarca
- Provinces: Central Savanna; Rionegro
- Municipalities: Zipaquirá; Tabio; Cajicá; Chía

Physical characteristics
- Source: Páramo de Guerrero
  - location: Zipaquirá
  - coordinates: 5°07′06.9″N 74°00′47.9″W
  - elevation: 3,700 m (12,100 ft)
- Mouth: Bogotá River
  - location: Chía
  - coordinates: 4°50′06.5″N 74°04′55.5″W
  - elevation: 2,650 m (8,690 ft)

Basin features
- River system: Bogotá River; Magdalena Basin; Caribbean Sea

The Río Frío ("Cold river") is a river on the Bogotá savanna and a right tributary of the Bogotá River. Its original name was Cisca river, probably a muysc cubun word. The river, in a basin of 6,008.69 hectares (23.1997 sq mi), originates on the Páramo de Guerrero in Zipaquirá at an altitude of 3,700 metres (12,100 ft). It flows through the municipalities Tabio and Cajicá and into the Bogotá River in the south of Chía, at 2,650 metres (8,690 ft) above sea level.

== Description ==
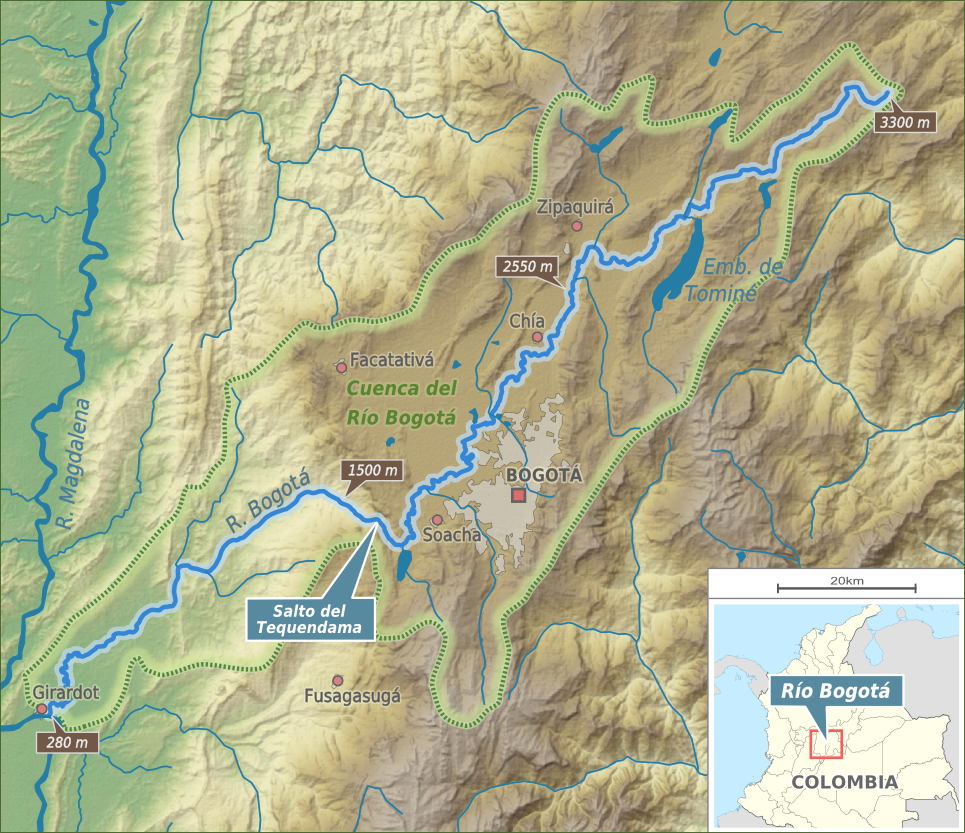
The Río Frío is a right tributary of the Bogotá River

Source and mouth of the Río Frío on the Bogotá savanna

The Río Frío originates on the Páramo de Guerrero at an altitude of 3,700 metres (12,100 ft), in the north of the municipality Zipaquirá. The river flows north and westward before flowing south through Tabio. From there, the river flows eastward through Cajicá to turn south through Chía where in the southern part of the municipality, close to the border with Suba, Bogotá the Río Frío flows into the Bogotá River at an elevation of 2,550 metres (8,370 ft).

In the valley of the Río Frío, shales belonging to the Guaduas Formation are outcropping. Also the Cacho, Bogotá and Chorrera Formations are present in the Río Frío valley. During the Last Glacial Maximum in the Late Pleistocene, the Río Frío deposited conglomerates and sands.

The basin of the Río Frío covers Zipaquirá, Pacho, Subachoque, Tabio, Cogua, Cota, Cajicá and Chía. The cultivation of flowers produces contamination of the Río Frío. The river overflows frequently. Carbon mining is present in the Río Frío basin.

== See also ==
- List of rivers of Colombia
- Altiplano Cundiboyacense
- Bogotá savanna
- Fucha River, Juan Amarillo River, Torca River, Tunjuelo River
