= La Calera, Cundinamarca =

La Calera
- Municipality and town
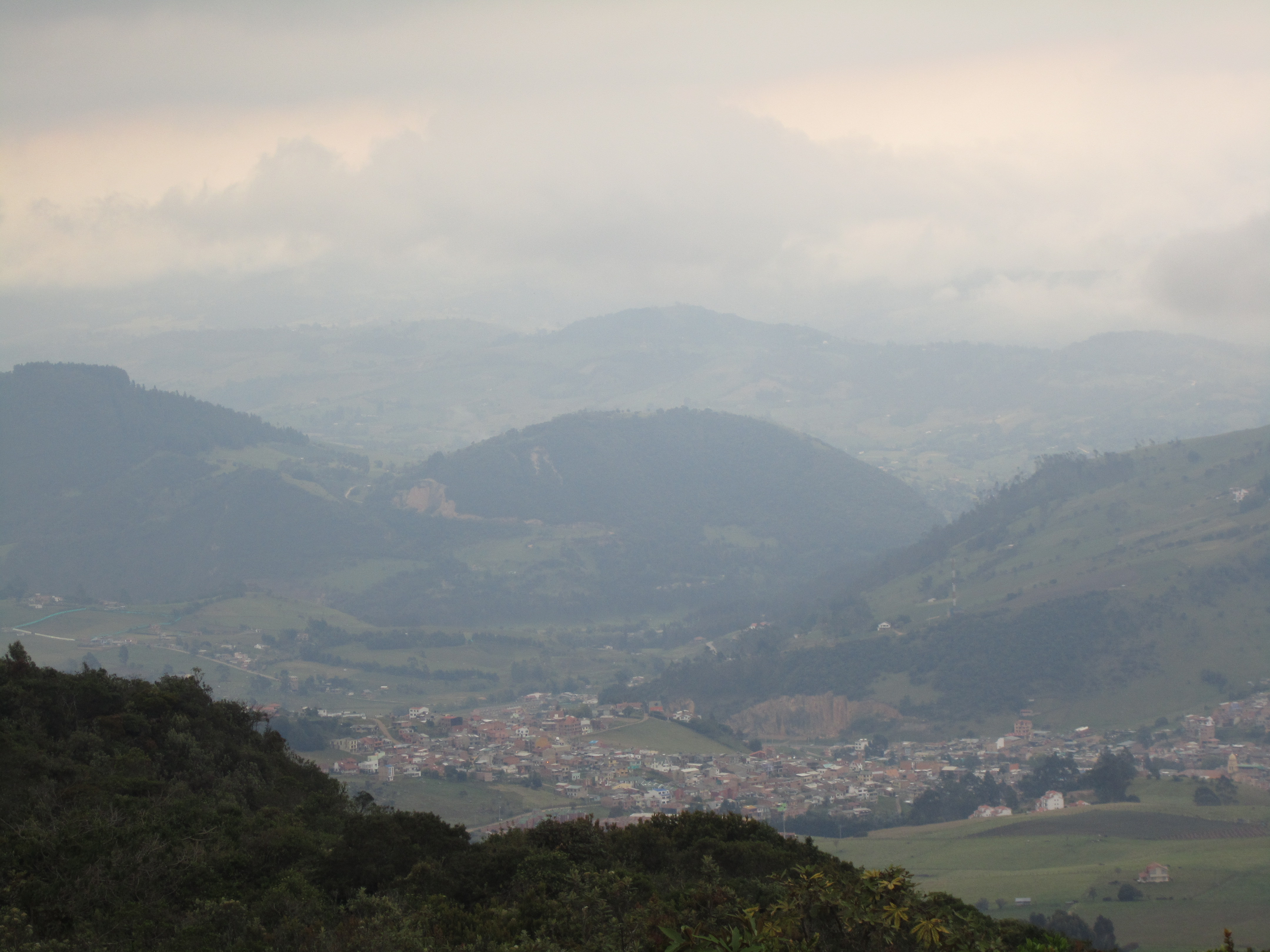
- La Calera viewed from a mountain to the west, just before a storm

- Flag Coat of arms

- Location of the municipality and town of La Calera in Colombia

- Location in Colombia
- Coordinates: 4°45′11″N 73°55′12″W
- Country: Colombia
- Department: Cundinamarca
- Province: Guavio Province
- Founded: 16 December 1772
- Founder: Pedro de Tovar y Buendía

Government
  - Mayor: Carlos Cenen Rioja (2020-2023)

Area
  - Municipality and town: 326.5 km^{2} (126.1 sq mi)
  - Urban: 1.51 km^{2} (0.58 sq mi)
- Elevation: 2,718 m (8,917 ft)

Population (2018 census)
  - Municipality and town: 29,868
  - Density: 91.48/km^{2} (236.9/sq mi)
  - Urban: 13,470
  - Urban density: 8,920/km^{2} (23,100/sq mi)
- Time zone: UTC-5 (Colombia Standard Time)
- Website: Official website

La Calera is a municipality and town of Colombia in the Guavio Province, part of the department of Cundinamarca. La Calera is a common weekend destination, mainly for the many restaurants, as it is approximately 18 kilometres (11 mi) over land from Bogotá, the capital city of Colombia. La Calera is located in the Eastern Ranges of the Colombian Andes, east of the capital and overlooking part of it. La Calera borders Guasca, Sopó and Chía in the north, Guasca and Junín in the east, Bogotá in the west and Choachí and Fómeque in the south.

Situated between 2,600 and 3,000 meters above sea level, the area encompasses both cold climate zones and páramo (high-altitude tundra). Its economy is diverse, including:

- Traditional agriculture (potatoes, corn, cubios, carrots, etc.)
- Livestock farming (cattle, horses, sheep, goats), trout farming
- Limestone and sand mining
- Former cement production (Cementos Samper, relocated in 1998), now operated by Cemex
- Bottled water production (Manantial Water, by The Coca-Cola Company)

Within the municipality lies the San Rafael Reservoir, a key water source for Bogotá's aqueduct system. It also provides access to the Chuza Reservoir, which is fed by the Chingaza Lagoon in the municipality of Fómeque—all part of the water supply subsystem for Bogotá and nearby municipalities.

Tourism plays a significant role thanks to access to the Chingaza National Natural Park, various scenic viewpoints, clubs along the Bogotá–La Calera highway, and countryside vacation homes.

== Etymology ==
- Language family: Indo-European
- Language: Latin
- Meaning: Calera comes from the Latin root cal- or kal-, derived from the words scal- or skal-, which convey meanings such as "to burn," "to blaze," "flames," "heat," or "sun’s intensity." The name of the town is derived from the limestone mine, called calera. In the Asturian language, calera refers to "a kiln where stone is burned to make lime," or "a lime quarry."

Latin terms like cla, claex, and calcem refer to a sedimentary rock composed of calcium carbonate, usually containing small amounts of clay, hematite, siderite, and quartz.

=== Name Origin / Motivation ===
The name La Calera originates from the limestone deposits in the area, which have been mined since the beginning of the Spanish conquest. The name originally referred to a historic estate called La Calera, which had kilns for producing lime. Indigenous people would bring limestone from the Teusacá mines to these kilns. Even today, lime is still extracted for cement production.

The place name La Calera comes from the term for a lime quarry or kiln. The indigenous settlement was called Teusacá, which some historians interpret as "prison," while Joaquín Acosta Ortegón suggests it meant "borrowed enclosure."

=== Historical Names ===
- Teusacá (pre-Columbian period)

== Geography ==
=== Orography (Topography) ===
La Calera lies within a beautiful valley along the Teusacá River. The municipality's territory is crossed from south to north by the Eastern Andes Mountain Range, which forms numerous branches. One of these, the Cruz Verde ridge, borders it on the east and west, creating a rugged landscape of valleys, hills, and elevations. This dramatic topography is one of its main tourist attractions.

=== San Rafael Reservoir ===
A notable feature is the San Rafael Reservoir, which serves as a major water source.

=== Hydrography ===
La Calera belongs to the Magdalena and Meta river basins and is crossed by two main rivers: the Teusacá River and the Río Blanco.

- Teusacá River: Originates in the Laguna del Verjón near Cerro de Monserrate and flows into the Bogotá River in Sopó. Important tributary streams include El Hato, Marmaja, Cara de Perro, Carrizal, Chocolatero, Cirujano, San Isidro, Siecha, Simayá, and Aguas Claras.
- Río Blanco: Begins at Laguna de Buitrago, on the border with Guasca, and is joined by significant streams such as La Marmaja, La Ramada, Calostros, and Jaboncillo (formed by the union of Chocolatero and Palacio streams). Eventually, it merges into the Río Negro at La Unión. A small natural bridge crosses the Palacio stream. Local birds called guacos nest in the depths of a large rock here, and indigenous people historically used their fat for medicinal purposes.

Key lagoons in the area include Buitrago, La Brava, and Los Patos.

== Geology ==
The geology of La Calera—specifically the Sabana de Bogotá and surrounding areas—is made up of three main layers:

- Upper layer: composed of reddish, bluish, greenish, and purplish clays. It contains thin, unworkable coal layers and unstable sandstone beds of varying grain sizes.
- Southwest of La Calera: contains workable coal seams at the base of the upper layer.
- Middle (productive) layer: this is where most of the coal is found. It is characterized by sandstone layers—called lajosa (upper) and la guía (lower)—as well as dark gray clays, which are often compact or laminated and sometimes contain coal.

== Municipal Borders ==
La Calera is bordered by the following municipalities and areas of Bogotá:

Direction	Bordering Area
Northwest	Chía (Vereda Fusca)
North	Sopó
Northeast	Guasca
West	Bogotá (Usaquén – Verbenal UPZ; neighborhoods Altos de Serrezuela and Lomitas)
East	Junín
Southwest	Bogotá (Chapinero – UPZ San Luis and Vereda Verjón Bajo Norte)
South	Choachí
Southeast	Fómeque

== History ==
=== Pre-Columbian and Colonial Era ===
Before Spanish colonization, La Calera was inhabited by the Muisca people. At the time of the Spanish arrival, the area had three communities:

- Teusacá (near present-day town)
- Suaque
- Tunjaque (east, in today's Mundo Nuevo area)
- In 1563, Juan Ruiz Clavijo received the Teusacá encomienda, and Francisco de Céspedes later received the others.
- By 1597, Teusacá was no longer inhabited by Indigenous people and lacked a church.
- In 1604, Oidor Lorenzo de Terrones gathered 359 Indigenous people from Teusacá, Suabso, Tabtiba, Suto, and Tuchasgula.
- Fray Nicolás de Troya was the parish priest at the time, and a new church was under construction by Alonso Hernández.
- In 1639, Teusacá's territories were added to Usaquén by Oidor Gabriel de Carvajal.

=== Residents at the Time ===
Indigenous People	Spanish or Creole Settlers
Teusacá: Sutatiba, Quin, Cayna, Guayacán	Cristóbal Clavijo Venegas
Suabsa: Uma, Guativa, Chucuaque, Zietatiba, Sacanica, Chugueque	Juan de Orejuela, Pedro de Urretabizqui
Chitasaguya: Tequa and Firativa	Francisco Rodríguez Galeano

- Other local names included Capador, Huérfano, Panadero, Negrito, etc., likely referring to professions or physical traits.

=== 17th–18th Century ===
- In the late 15th and 16th centuries, Hacienda La Calera belonged to the Clavijo family, starting with Cristóbal Ruiz Clavijo, a conquistador under Gonzalo Jiménez de Quesada.
- The hacienda passed through several generations before reaching Fernando Clavijo, whose children likely sold it to Joseph Salvador Ricaurte.
- By 1765, the estate belonged to Pedro de Tovar y Buendía, whose family helped establish the parish of Nuestra Señora del Rosario, around which the town formed. The town is considered to have been founded on December 16, 1772.

=== Republican Era ===
- On March 14, 1850, by Decree No. 73 from the Government of the Province of Bogotá, the district of La Calera was dissolved and its territory incorporated into the capital.
- On October 21, 1851, Ordinance No. 154 reinstated the parish district of La Calera, effective January 1, 1852.
- On December 14, 1853, Ordinance No. 197 elevated La Calera to the status of a village.

=== Modern Era ===
- In September 1998, the Siberia area near La Calera was left desolate after the Samper cement factory shut down due to relocation.

== Mobility (Transportation) ==
=== Access Routes ===
- From Bogotá: Via National Route 50 from the Chapinero locality, take Avenida Circunvalar at Calle 85 heading north. You pass the Los Patios Toll and enter the road managed by Perimetral de Oriente de Bogotá S.A.S. until reaching La Calera. From there, the road continues to Sopó, passing through La Cabaña Toll and connecting to National Route 55 toward Tunja via Briceño.
- From Usaquén: A variant route through neighborhoods El Codito and Altos de Serrezuela leads to the village of San Cayetano, connecting with Route 55.

=== Rural Access ===
- Routes include:
  - From Márquez to Sopó (north)
  - From Verjón Bajo (south) connecting to Bogotá and Choachí
  - Through Chingaza crossing Fómeque to San Juanito, in Meta department

=== Public Transportation ===
- From Bogotá: Intermunicipal buses depart from Calle 72 with Carrera 11 (near Universidad Pedagógica and Iglesia de la Porciúncula). This route—via Verjón Bajo—follows Carrera 7 to Calle 81, then Avenida Circunvalar and on to La Calera. It passes neighborhoods like San Luis, Vereda El Hato, San Rafael Reservoir, and continues into the town.
- From El Salitre: Buses from the intersection of the roads to Sopó, Guasca, and La Calera serve routes passing through Potosí Shopping Center, the POB Operations Center, and gated communities such as Macadamia, before reaching La Calera.

==== Taxis ====
- Urban taxis: Yellow cars operating in the town center.
- Rural taxis: White pickup trucks that serve nearby rural areas.

==== Rural and Village Transport ====
- Bus service is available to transport residents in rural villages (veredas).

== Economy ==
Main economical activity in La Calera is cement mining. The geological formation outcropping in the municipality is the Guaduas Formation.

=== Cement Era ===
- For many years, La Calera's economy centered on mining, especially the Samper Cement Company, which provided direct and indirect employment to around 3,000 residents.
- When Samper shut down operations, the municipality was unprepared, resulting in long-term economic stagnation, exacerbated by the lack of strategic employment policies from local authorities.

=== Current Economy ===
- Diverse economy including:
  - Traditional agriculture (potatoes, corn, cubios, carrots)
  - Livestock (cattle, horses, sheep, goats)
  - Trout farming
  - Mining (limestone and sand)
  - Industrial activity including:
    - Cemex cement production
    - Manantial water (owned by The Coca-Cola Company)
    - Companies such as Winter, Tecnoconcreto, Flores El Cortijo, and local microenterprises

== Symbols ==
=== Coat of Arms ===
- Divided into two main sections with a helmet at the top and decorative scrolls (lambrequins) on the sides.
- Right field (blue): Features a golden band with green dragon heads.
- Left field (blue): Displays a gold sun.
- Below is a ribbon with the surname "Tovar y Buendía", honoring Pedro de Tovar y Buendía, owner of the estate around which the town was founded.

=== Flag ===
- Divided into three equal sections: one vertical and two horizontal.
  - Left vertical strip (orange): Symbolizes the nobility and kindness of the people of La Calera.
  - Top horizontal strip (green): Represents the town's natural wealth.
  - Bottom horizontal strip (limestone gray): Signifies the area's mineral wealth.

== Politics ==
=== Mayor's Office (2020–2023 Term) ===
Carlos Cenén Escobar Rioja

=== 2019 Election Controversy ===
- His candidacy was questioned due to potential double political affiliation (Conservative Party and Party of Ethnic Reaffirmation).
- Despite the challenge, he was elected.

=== City Council (2020–2024) ===
- President: Jaime Danilo Rincón Pardo
- First VP: Luisa Fernanda Camacho
- Second VP: María Eugenia Bustamante
- Secretary: José Fernando Torres Cortés

=== Municipal Secretariats ===
1. General and Government Secretariat: Includes police inspection, contracting, social development, and tourism.
2. Education and Social Development: Manages health services, sports, culture, and public library.
3. Finance Secretariat: Handles treasury, budget, and accounting.
4. Planning Secretariat: Oversees project bank, SISBEN (social program), and records.
5. Public Works Secretariat: Supervises maintenance of public infrastructure.
6. Environmental and Rural Development Secretariat: Supports agricultural and technical services.

=== Public Services ===
- Electricity: Provided by Enel–Codensa
- Public lighting: Handled by Grupo Empresarial Dolmen
- Waste collection: Managed by Empresa de Servicios Públicos de La Calera (ESPUCAL)
- Natural gas: Distributed by Vanti

== Education ==
La Calera is home to a mix of urban and rural schools, including:

- Urban schools:
  - Colegio Cooperativo Paulo VI
  - Gimnasio Campestre Los Arrayanes
  - Colegio Tilatá
  - Colegio Hacienda los Alcaparros
  - Colegio La Colina
  - Colegio Cambridge (La Calera campus)
  - Colegio La Nueva Esperanza (CNE)
  - Instituto Pedagógico Campestre (IPC)
  - SENA training center
- Public institutions:
  - Institución Educativa Departamental La Calera
    - Includes Escuela Juan XXIII and Escuela Antonia Santos
- Rural schools:
  - Institución Educativa Departamental Rural Integrada La Calera (Mundo Nuevo)
    - Serves students from villages like El Manzano, La Polonia, Treinta y Seis, Tunjaque, and others

== Tourism ==
Being a mostly agricultural town, La Calera offers traditional countryside experiences, such as:

- Farmers' markets: Selling organic, locally grown produce
- Handicrafts: Wool textiles, wicker and wood furniture

Recreational activities include:

- Paragliding
- Mountain biking
- Hiking

=== Points of Interest ===
- La Calera Hot Springs (via Bogotá–La Calera route)
- Chapel of the Government House (once housed works by Gregorio Vásquez de Arce y Ceballos)
- San Rafael Reservoir and Lookout
- Cerros (Hills): La Aurora, La Hondura, Piedra, San Vicente
- Salt Mountain Range
- Chingaza National Park
- La Chucua Lagoon (Mundo Nuevo)
- Seven Waterfalls (Mundo Nuevo)
- Main Plaza: Includes the Church of Nuestra Señora del Rosario and Government House

== Born in La Calera ==
- Israel Corredor, former professional cyclist, Corredor represented Colombia in various international competitions.
- Amadeo Rodríguez Vergara: Conservative general, former Bogotá congressman, and mayor of La Calera during the Bogotazo (1948). He fought in the war against Peru and is mentioned in Nobel laureate Mario Vargas Llosa's novel "The Dream of the Celt". Served as Colombian Consul in Barcelona and the town library is named in his honor.

== Gallery ==
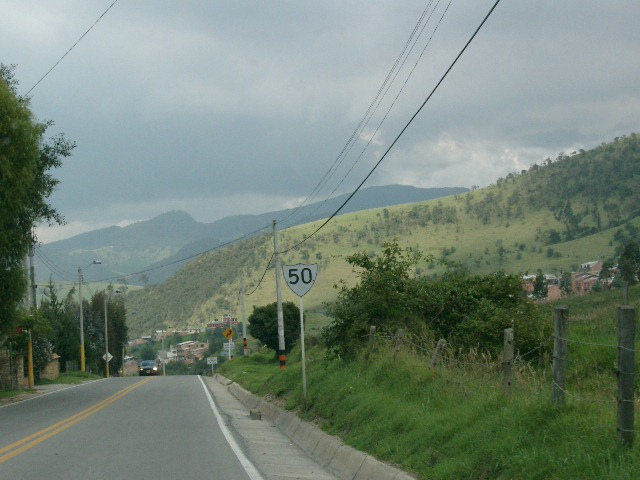
Road to La Calera

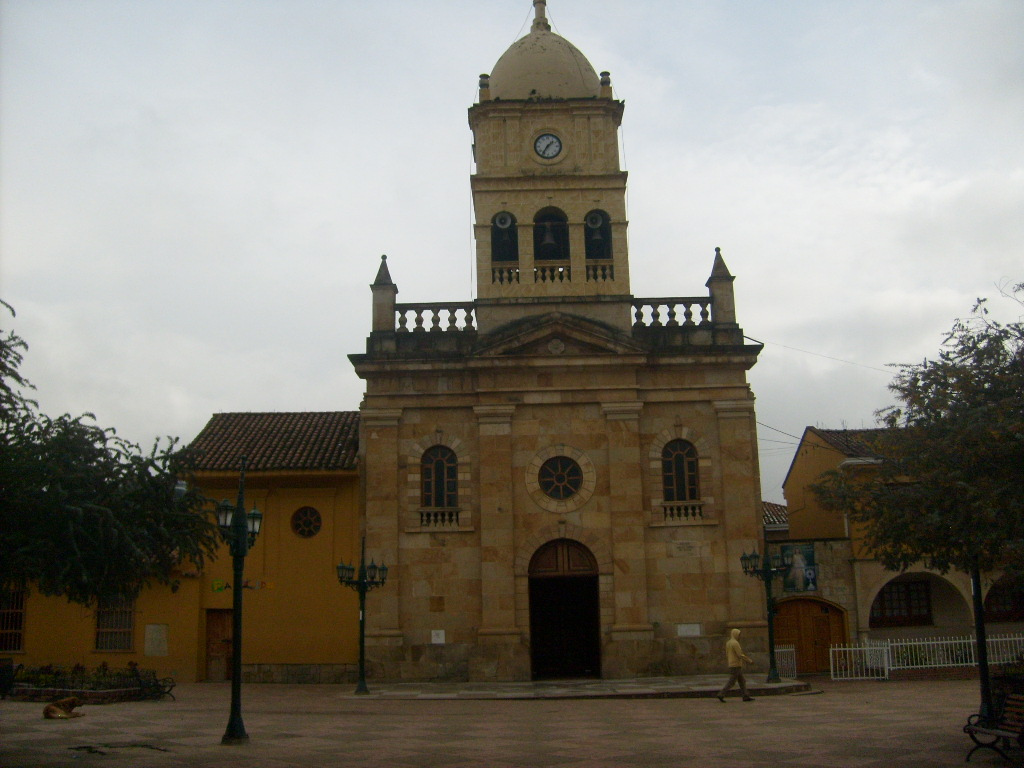
The largest Catholic church in La Calera

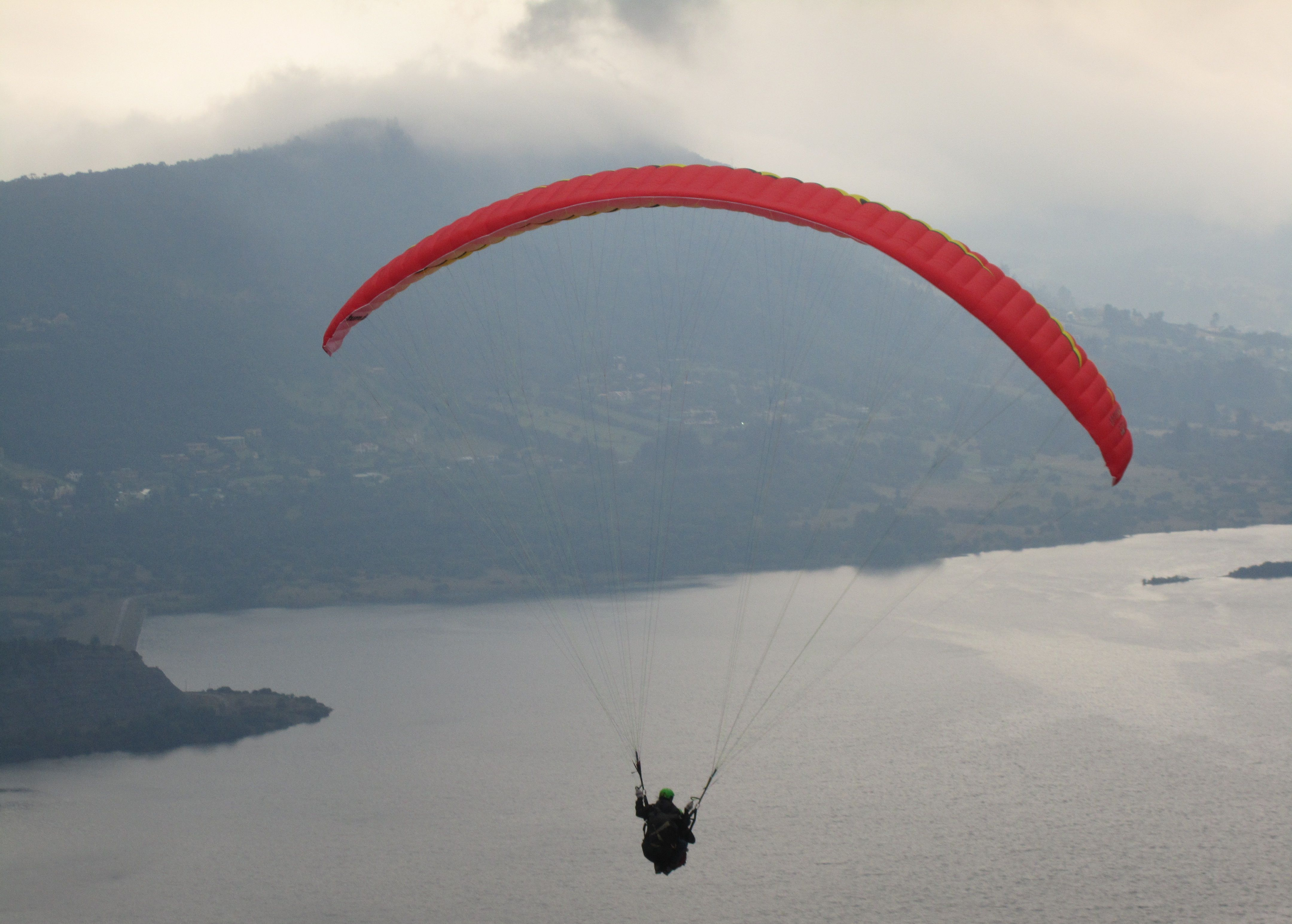
Paragliding over San Rafael Reservoir

Cabalgatas En La Calera
