= Teusacá River =

River in Colombia

- Location of the Teusacá River in Colombia
- Etymology: Muysccubun: Teusacá
- Native name: Río Teusacá (Spanish)

Location
- Country: Colombia
- Department: Cundinamarca
- Municipalities: Bogotá; La Calera; Guasca; Sopó; Cajicá
- Localities: Santa Fe

Physical characteristics
- Source: Eastern Hills
  - location: Alto Los Tunjos
  - coordinates: 4°33′47.3″N 74°01′43.3″W
  - elevation: 3,560 m (11,680 ft)
- Mouth: Bogotá River
  - location: Cajicá
  - coordinates: 4°56′39.2″N 74°00′09.2″W
  - elevation: 2,554 m (8,379 ft)
- Length: 69 km (43 mi)
- Basin size: 358.17 km^{2} (138.29 sq mi)
- Discharge
  - average: 2.2 m^{3}/s (78 cu ft/s)
  - minimum: 1.4 m^{3}/s (49 cu ft/s)
  - maximum: 4.0 m^{3}/s (140 cu ft/s)

Basin features
- River system: Bogotá River; Magdalena Basin; Caribbean Sea
- Landmarks: PNN Chingaza
- Waterbodies: San Rafael Reservoir

The Teusacá River is a river in the Eastern Hills of Bogotá and on the Bogotá savanna. It is a left tributary of the Bogotá River, Colombia. The river of 69 kilometres (43 mi) long originates at an elevation of 3,560 metres (11,680 ft) at the Alto Los Tunjos, Santa Fe, and flows northward through the municipalities La Calera, Guasca, Sopó, to flow into the Bogotá River in Cajicá at an elevation of 2,554 metres (8,379 ft). The upper part of the Teusacá River basin has a páramo ecosystem with the páramos of Chingaza, El Verjón and Cruz Verde surrounding the river. The San Rafael Reservoir in La Calera, important water source for the Colombian capital, is sourced by the Teusacá River.

== Etymology ==
Teusacá is derived from Muysccubun, the indigenous language of the Muisca, who inhabited the Altiplano Cundiboyacense before the Spanish conquest. Teusacá was the name of a settlement in the Muisca Confederation, possibly in the Teusacá basin between Guasca and Usaquén.

== Description ==
Source and mouth of the Teusacá River on the Bogotá savanna

The 69 kilometres (43 mi) long Teusacá River originates at an elevation of 3,560 metres (11,680 ft) on the Alto Los Tunjos, El Verjón Páramo, in the locality Santa Fe in the Eastern Hills of Bogotá and flows northward to La Calera. In this municipality the San Rafael Reservoir, important water source of Bogotá, is located in the Teusacá River basin. The Teusacá River continues northward through Guasca and flows to the northwest in Sopó and Tocancipá. North of the urban centre of Cajicá, the Teusacá River flows into the Bogotá River at an elevation of 2,552 metres (8,373 ft). Tiny parts of Chía and Ubaque are part of the Teusacá River basin that has a total area of 358.17 square kilometres (138.29 sq mi). The precipitation in the basin varies from 500 to 1,600 millimetres (20 to 63 in) per year.

=== Climate and vegetation ===
The maximum temperature ranges from 12 to 15 °C (54 to 59 °F) and the minimum oscillates between 6 and 9 °C (43 and 48 °F). The maximum discharge has been registered in August, with 4.0 cubic metres per second (140 cu ft/s) and the minimum in March with 1.4 cubic metres per second (49 cu ft/s).

The vegetation ranges from páramo to Andean forests with characteristic species Illex kunthiana, Myrcianthes leucoxyla, Myrsine guianensis, Miconia squamulosa, Clethra fimbriata, Arcythophylum muticum, Baccharis rupicola, Hydrocotyle bonplandii, Hypericum thuyoides, Paepalanthus columbiensis, Cladonia clavatum and Weinmannia tomentosa. The total number of bird species counted is 307, with other fauna as mammals, reptiles and amphibians registered. The Chingaza National Natural Park and Páramo de Cruz Verde are located to the east of the Teusacá River.

=== Geology ===
The Teusacá River basin is located in a synclinal in the Eastern Ranges of the Colombian Andes, with the Late Cretaceous Guadalupe Group, the Upper Cretaceous to Paleocene Guaduas, the Paleogene Cacho and Bogotá Formations, and younger unconformable Neogene formations present in the Teusacá synclinal. The synclinal is bounded to the west by the Teusacá Fault, a north–south trending thrust fault dipping to the east, thrusting the members of the older Guadalupe group on top of the Guaduas Formation. In the Teusacá River basin, 25 quarries for carbon and construction materials are active.

== Gallery ==
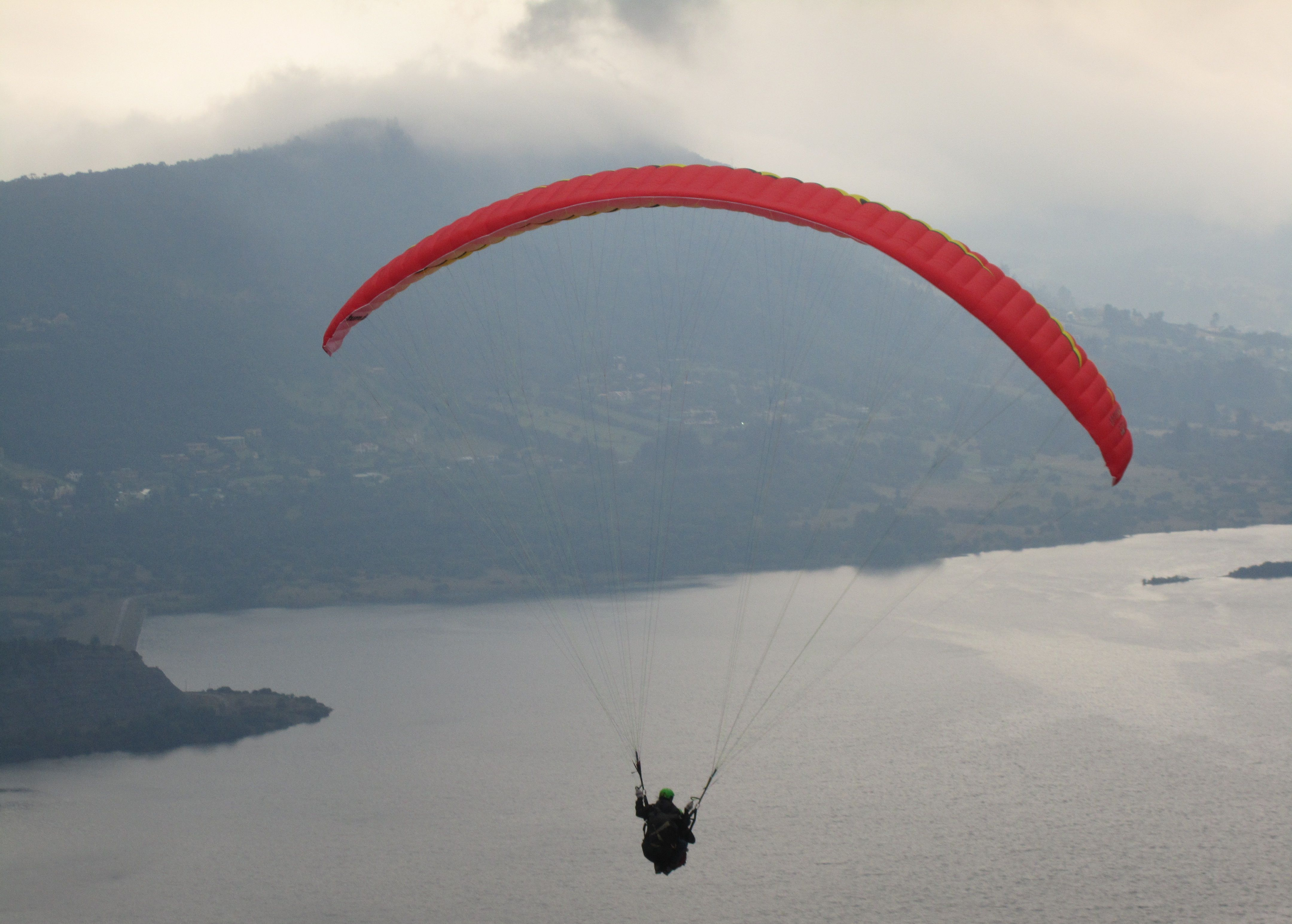
Paragliding over the San Rafael Reservoir

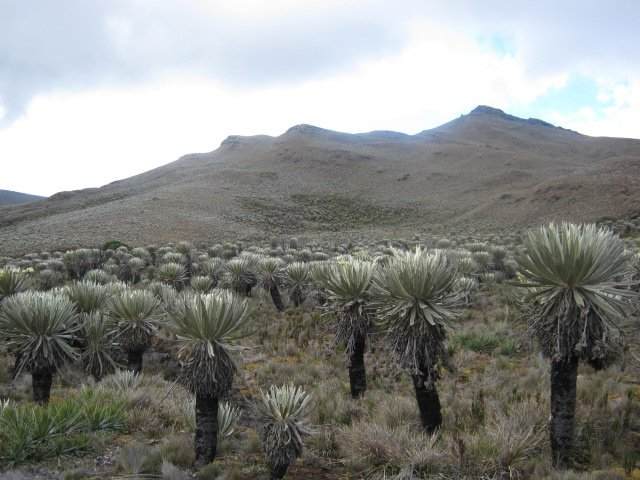
The Páramo de Cruz Verde is in the Teusacá River basin

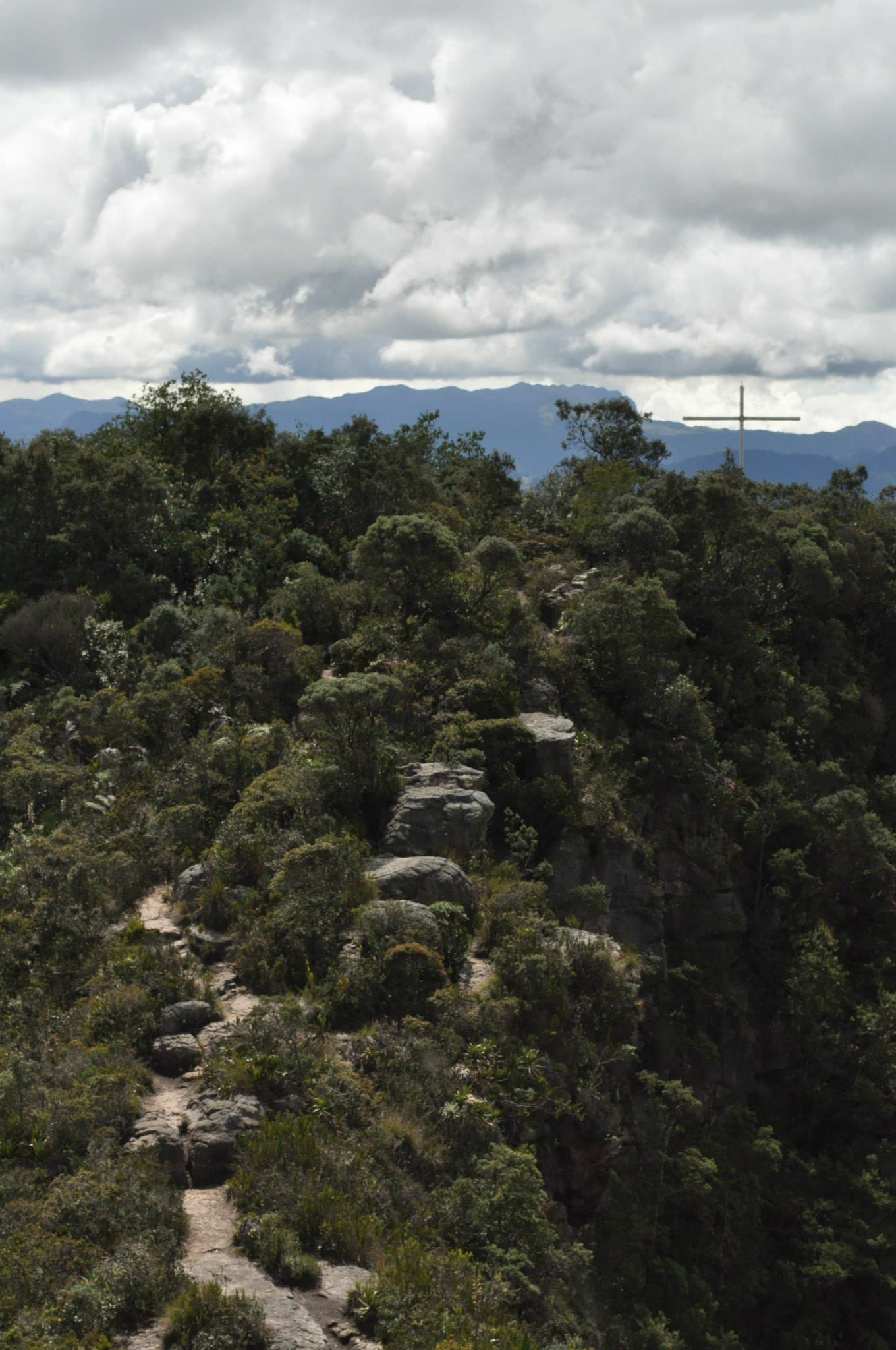
Sendero de la Cruz walking trail

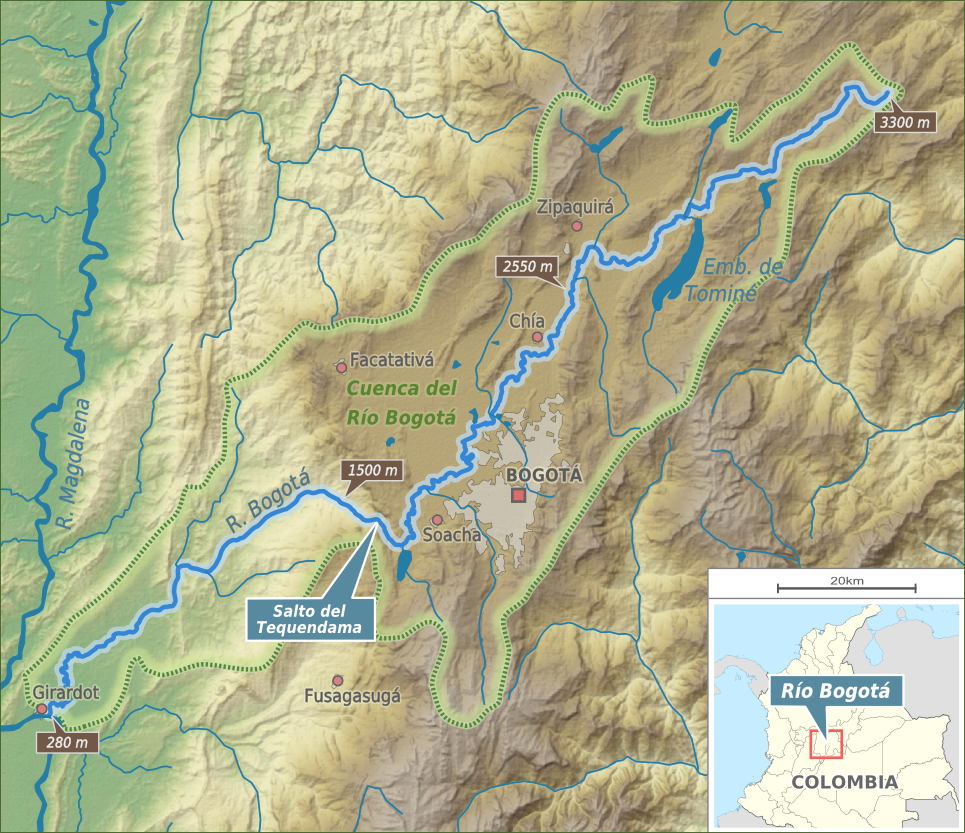
Teusacá River flowing into the Bogotá River just north of the 2550 m mark

== See also ==
- List of rivers of Colombia, Muisca toponyms
- Eastern Hills, Bogotá
- Bogotá savanna
- Juan Amarillo, Fucha, Tunjuelo River
