= Chorrera (disambiguation) =

Chorrera may refer to:

- Chorrera culture, pre-Columbian civilisation of Ecuador and southern Colombia
- Chorrera Formation, Pliocene geologic formation of the Altiplano Cundiboyacense, Colombia
- Chorrera (moth), a genus of snout moths
- Torreón de la Chorrera, fortified tower in Havana, Cuba
- Chorreras, Spain, a site in southeastern Spain formerly host to a Phoenician colony
