= Cacho Formation =

Geological formation in the Colombian Andes

- Stratigraphic range: Mid-Late Paleocene; ~60–55 Ma
- Type: Geological formation
- Underlies: Bogotá Formation
- Overlies: Guaduas Formation
- Thickness: 50–400 m (160–1,310 ft)

Lithology
- Primary: Sandstone
- Other: Shale

Location
- Coordinates: 4°35′11.4″N 74°14′25.8″W
- Region: Bogotá savanna Altiplano Cundiboyacense; Eastern Ranges; Andes
- Country: Colombia

Type section
- Named by: Julivert
- Location: Soacha
- Year defined: 1963
- Coordinates: 4°35′11.4″N 74°14′25.8″W
- Region: Cundinamarca
- Country: Colombia

The Cacho Formation (Spanish: Formación Cacho, E_{1}C, Tpc, Tec) is a geological formation of the Altiplano Cundiboyacense, Eastern Ranges of the Colombian Andes. The predominantly sandstone formation with thin intercalated beds of shales dates to the Paleogene period; Middle to Late Paleocene epochs, and has a maximum thickness of 400 metres (1,300 ft).

== Definition ==
The formation was first described by Hubach in 1931 and 1957 and named by Campbell in 1962 and Julivert in 1963.

== Description ==
=== Lithologies ===
The Cacho Formation consists of white, yellow and reddish fine to coarse cross-bedded sandstones in thick banks intercalated with reddish and grey shales.

=== Stratigraphy and depositional environment ===
The 50 to 400 metres (160 to 1,310 ft) thick Cacho Formation overlies the Guaduas Formation and is overlain by the Bogotá Formation. The age has been estimated to be Late Paleocene, based on paleoflora studied by Thomas van der Hammen in 1957. The formation is laterally equivalent to the Lower Socha and Barco Formations.

== Outcrops ==
Type locality of the Cacho Formation in the south of the Bogotá savanna

The Cacho Formation is apart from its type locality in Soacha, found in the Eastern Hills of Bogotá, and many other locations in the Eastern Ranges up until the south of Boyacá. The synclinals of the Río Frío, Checua-Lenguazaque, Sesquilé, Sisga, Subachoque, Teusacá, Siecha, and the anticlinal of Guatavita are composed of the Cacho Formation.

== See also ==
Geology of the Eastern Hills
Geology of the Ocetá Páramo
Geology of the Altiplano Cundiboyacense
