= Coussapoa arachnoidea =

Scientific classification
- Kingdom: Plantae
- Clade: Tracheophytes
- Clade: Angiosperms
- Clade: Eudicots
- Clade: Rosids
- Order: Rosales
- Family: Urticaceae
- Genus: Coussapoa
- Species: C. arachnoidea

Binomial name
- Coussapoa arachnoidea Akkermans & C.C.Berg

Species of flowering plant

Coussapoa arachnoidea is a species of flowering plant in the family Urticaceae. It is native to Brazil's largest region, the North Region, and the state of Amapá.

== Description ==
A small tree, typically reaching up to 3 meters in height. It is known to commonly occur in seasonal semideciduous forests.
