= Chorrera Formation =

Geological formation in Colombia

- Stratigraphic range: Pliocene (Montehermosan-Chapadmalalan); ~5–3 Ma
- Type: Geological formation
- Underlies: Subachoque Formation
- Overlies: Guadalupe Gp.
- Thickness: up to 40 m (130 ft)

Lithology
- Primary: Conglomerate

Location
- Coordinates: 4°55′30.0″N 74°06′22.6″W
- Region: Bogotá savanna, Altiplano Cundiboyacense; Eastern Ranges, Andes
- Country: Colombia

Type section
- Named for: La Chorrera waterfall
- Named by: Helmens & Hammen
- Location: Río Frío, Subachoque/Tabio
- Year defined: 1995
- Coordinates: 4°55′30.0″N 74°06′22.6″W
- Region: Cundinamarca
- Country: Colombia

The Chorrera Formation (Spanish: Formación Chorrera, N_{2ch}) is a geological formation of the Bogotá savanna, Altiplano Cundiboyacense, Eastern Ranges of the Colombian Andes. The formation consists of coarse to very coarse conglomerates. The Chorrera Formation dates to the Neogene period; Pliocene epoch (Montehermosan to Chapadmalalan in the SALMA classification), and has a maximum thickness of 40 metres (130 ft).

== Etymology ==
The formation was defined by Helmens and Van der Hammen in 1995 after the La Chorrera waterfall in Subachoque.

== Description ==
=== Lithologies ===
The Chorrera Formation consists of coarse to very coarse conglomerates.

=== Stratigraphy and depositional environment ===
The Chorrera Formation unconformably overlies the Late Cretaceous Guadalupe Group. The formation is overlain by the Pleistocene Subachoque Formation. The age of the Chorrera Formation has been estimated to be Late Pliocene based on its stratigraphical position. The depositional environment is characterised by alluvial fans formed during the main phase of tectonic uplift of the Eastern Ranges in the Late Pliocene. Dutch geologist Salomon Kroonenberg, who studied the Neogene uplift of the Eastern Andes in Colombia, defines the main stage of uplift between six and four million years ago. Other Dutch geologists Helmens, Van der Hammen and Hooghiemstra have pushed back this uplift phase to between 4.5 and 3 Ma. The facies origin of the Chorrera Formation is comparable to the Marichuela Formation, outcropping on the eastern edge of the Bogotá savanna, yet different in stratigraphic position. The deposition of sediments of the Chorrera Formation is time-equivalent with the explosive phase of the Paipa–Iza volcanic complex, active between 4.7 and 3.6 Ma, and the Miocene to Late Pliocene Tilatá Formation.

== Outcrops ==
Type locality of the Chorrera Formation on the northern Bogotá savanna

The Chorrera Formation is found at its type locality in the synclinal of the Río Frío, east of Subachoque, Cundinamarca.

== See also ==
Geology of the Eastern Hills
Geology of the Ocetá Páramo
Geology of the Altiplano Cundiboyacense
