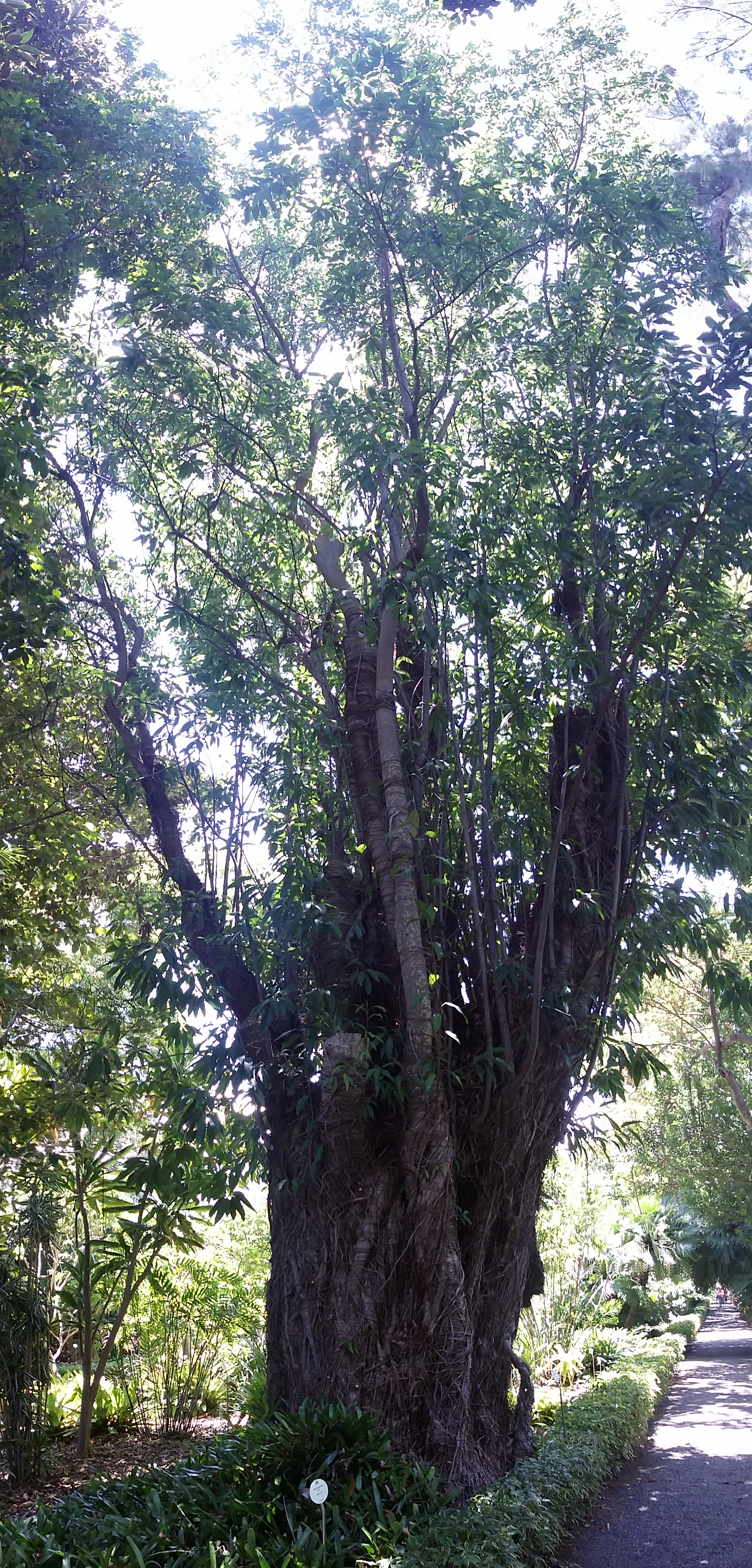
- Coussapoa microcarpa in the botanical garden of Puerto de la Cruz (Tenerife, Canary Islands)

Scientific classification
- Kingdom: Plantae
- Clade: Tracheophytes
- Clade: Angiosperms
- Clade: Eudicots
- Clade: Rosids
- Order: Rosales
- Family: Urticaceae
- Tribe: Cecropieae
- Genus: Coussapoa; Aubl.

= Coussapoa =

Genus of flowering plants

Coussapoa is a genus of flowering plants belonging to the family Urticaceae.

Its native range is Mexico, Central & Southern Tropical America.

Species:

- Coussapoa angustifolia Aubl.
- Coussapoa arachnoidea Akkermans & C.C.Berg
- Coussapoa argentea Akkermans & C.C.Berg
- Coussapoa asperifolia Trécul
- Coussapoa batavorum Akkermans & C.C.Berg
- Coussapoa brevipes Pittier
- Coussapoa chocoensis Cuatrec.
- Coussapoa cinnamomea Cuatrec.
- Coussapoa cinnamomifolia Mildbr.
- Coussapoa contorta Cuatrec.
- Coussapoa crassivenosa Mildbr.
- Coussapoa cupularis Akkermans & C.C.Berg
- Coussapoa curranii S.F.Blake
- Coussapoa darienensis C.C.Berg
- Coussapoa david-smithii C.C.Berg
- Coussapoa dolichandra Cuatrec.
- Coussapoa duquei Standl.
- Coussapoa echinata Akkermans & C.C.Berg
- Coussapoa ferruginea Trécul
- Coussapoa floccosa Akkermans & C.C.Berg
- Coussapoa fulvescens C.C.Berg
- Coussapoa glaberrima W.C.Burger
- Coussapoa herthae Mildbr.
- Coussapoa jatun-sachensis C.C.Berg
- Coussapoa latifolia Aubl.
- Coussapoa leprieurii Benoist
- Coussapoa longipedunculata Akkermans & C.C.Berg
- Coussapoa macerrima Standl. & L.O.Williams ex Akkermans & C.C.Berg
- Coussapoa manuensis C.C.Berg
- Coussapoa microcarpa (Schott) Rizzini
- Coussapoa microcephala Trécul
- Coussapoa nitida Miq.
- Coussapoa nymphaeifolia Standl.
- Coussapoa oligocephala Donn.Sm.
- Coussapoa orthoneura Standl.
- Coussapoa ovalifolia Trécul
- Coussapoa pachyphylla Akkermans & C.C.Berg
- Coussapoa parviceps Standl.
- Coussapoa parvifolia Standl.
- Coussapoa peruviana C.C.Berg
- Coussapoa purpusii Standl.
- Coussapoa scabra Akkermans & C.C.Berg
- Coussapoa sprucei Mildbr.
- Coussapoa tessmannii Mildbr.
- Coussapoa tolimensis C.C.Berg
- Coussapoa trinervia Spruce ex Mildbr.
- Coussapoa valaria C.C.Berg
- Coussapoa vannifolia Cuatrec.
- Coussapoa villosa Poepp. & Endl.
- Coussapoa viridifolia Cuatrec.
