= Tabio =

- Municipality and town
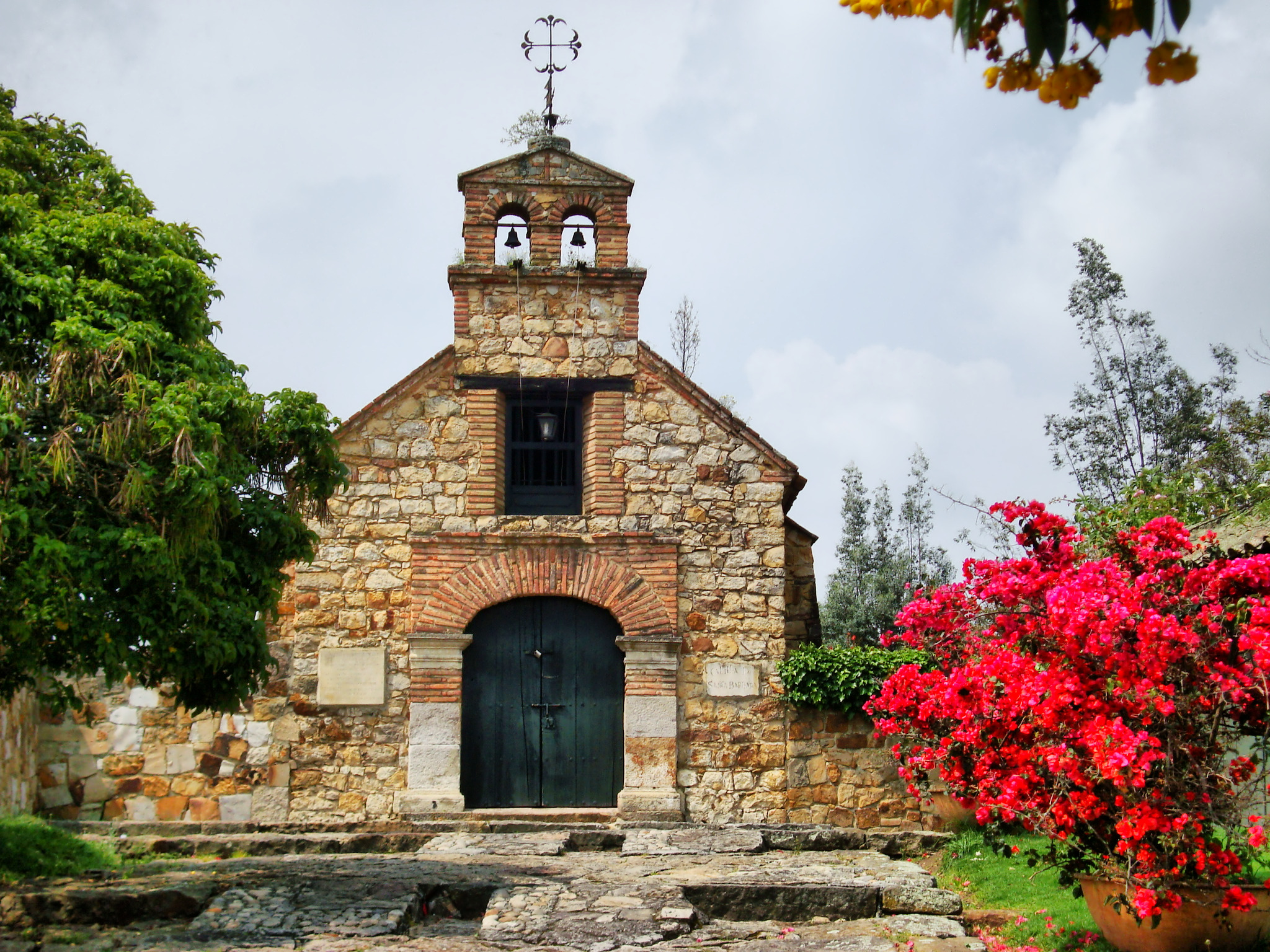
- Chapel of Santa Barbara

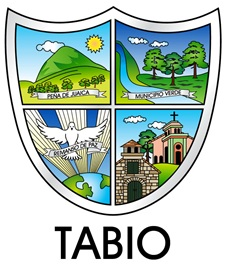
- Flag Coat of arms

- Location of the municipality and town inside Cundinamarca Department of Colombia

- Location in Colombia
- Coordinates: 4°54′57″N 74°5′54″W
- Country: Colombia
- Department: Cundinamarca
- Province: Central Savanna Province
- Founded: 8 April 1603
- Founder: Diego Gómez de Mena

Government
  - Mayor: Rubén Darío Acero García (2016-2019)

Area
  - Municipality and town: 74.5 km^{2} (28.8 sq mi)
  - Urban: 0.43 km^{2} (0.17 sq mi)
- Elevation: 2,569 m (8,428 ft)

Population (2015)
  - Municipality and town: 27,033
  - Density: 363/km^{2} (940/sq mi)
  - Urban: 13,145
- Time zone: UTC-5 (Colombia Standard Time)
- Website: Official website

Tabio is a municipality and town of Colombia in the department of Cundinamarca. It is located 45 km (28 mi) from Bogotá. The town was officially founded April 8, 1603, by Diego Gómez de Mena, on grounds that were the property of the native Muisca who inhabited the area. Tabio borders Zipaquirá in the north, Cajicá in the east, Subachoque in the west and Tenjo in the south.

== Etymology ==
The name Tabio comes from the Chibcha word Teib meaning "dent" or "hole", which refers to its geographical location, next to the mouth of the Río Frío (also called Sinca).

== History ==
The Muisca occupied the current location of Tabio before the Spanish conquest, and were largely devoted to agriculture. The Muisca tribe comprised two confederations of small tribes, the Hunza of the northern area, whose sovereign was called zaque, and the Bacatá of the southern area, whose sovereign was the zipa, and which included the territory of Tabio.

The natural hot springs in Tabio were famous among the Muisca, and they were said to have a temple there devoted to the Goddess of Waters. Under the Spanish conquest, the native Muisca were expropriated and the area was put under a colonial rule that issued the foundation of Tabio in 1603.

== Economy ==
Secondary and tertiary economic sectors are relatively underdeveloped in Tabio. Main industrial crops are devoted to floriculture. Potatoes, corn, peas, and carrots are also cultivated.

== Tourism ==
Tabio is well known for its natural hot springs, which are said to have therapeutic properties. It is also known for the annual festival of torbellino, a traditional Andean Colombian dance.

== Climate ==
Climate data for Tabio, elevation 2,620 m (8,600 ft), (1981–2010)
Month	Jan	Feb	Mar	Apr	May	Jun	Jul	Aug	Sep	Oct	Nov	Dec	Year
Mean daily maximum °C (°F)	19.9 (67.8)	19.5 (67.1)	20.0 (68.0)	19.6 (67.3)	18.8 (65.8)	18.4 (65.1)	18.2 (64.8)	18.6 (65.5)	19.0 (66.2)	19.5 (67.1)	19.7 (67.5)	20.1 (68.2)	19.3 (66.7)
Daily mean °C (°F)	13.4 (56.1)	13.6 (56.5)	13.9 (57.0)	14.2 (57.6)	13.8 (56.8)	13.5 (56.3)	13.4 (56.1)	13.5 (56.3)	13.6 (56.5)	13.4 (56.1)	13.5 (56.3)	13.5 (56.3)	13.6 (56.5)
Mean daily minimum °C (°F)	7.4 (45.3)	8.0 (46.4)	8.4 (47.1)	9.6 (49.3)	9.8 (49.6)	9.4 (48.9)	9.5 (49.1)	9.1 (48.4)	8.9 (48.0)	9.2 (48.6)	9.0 (48.2)	8.2 (46.8)	8.9 (48.0)
Average precipitation mm (inches)	27.0 (1.06)	48.5 (1.91)	60.1 (2.37)	91.4 (3.60)	84.2 (3.31)	54.9 (2.16)	55.7 (2.19)	50.8 (2.00)	61.8 (2.43)	94.0 (3.70)	86.3 (3.40)	51.4 (2.02)	766.4 (30.17)
Average precipitation days	9	10	13	16	18	17	18	19	16	17	14	10	176
Average relative humidity (%)	75	78	78	80	81	81	79	78	78	81	81	79	79
Mean monthly sunshine hours	192.2	158.1	142.6	117.0	114.7	114.0	124.0	130.2	126.0	133.3	144.0	167.4	1,663.5
Mean daily sunshine hours	6.2	5.6	4.6	3.9	3.7	3.8	4.0	4.2	4.2	4.3	4.8	5.4	4.6
Source: Instituto de Hidrologia Meteorologia y Estudios Ambientales

== Gallery ==
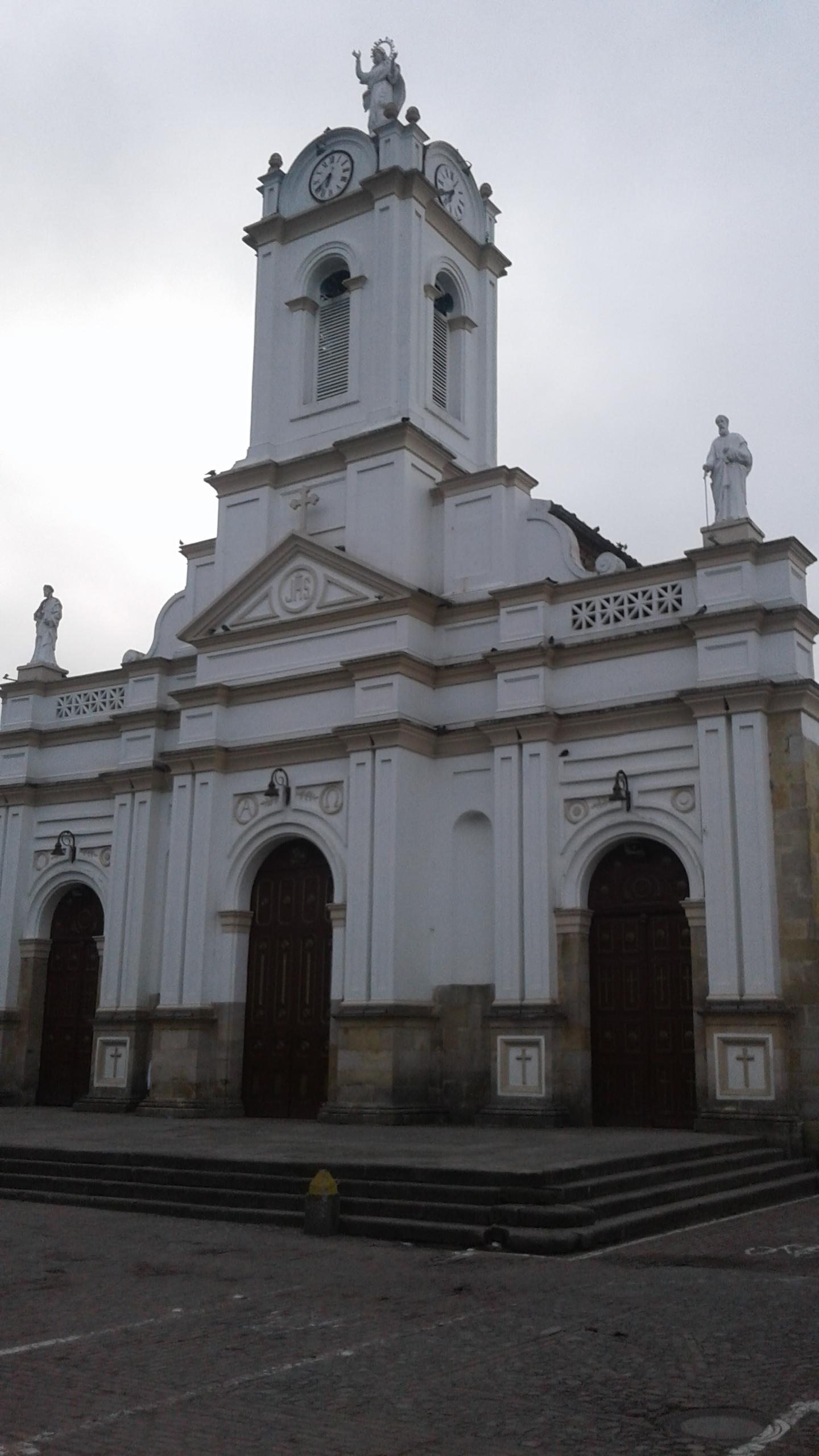
Church of Tabio

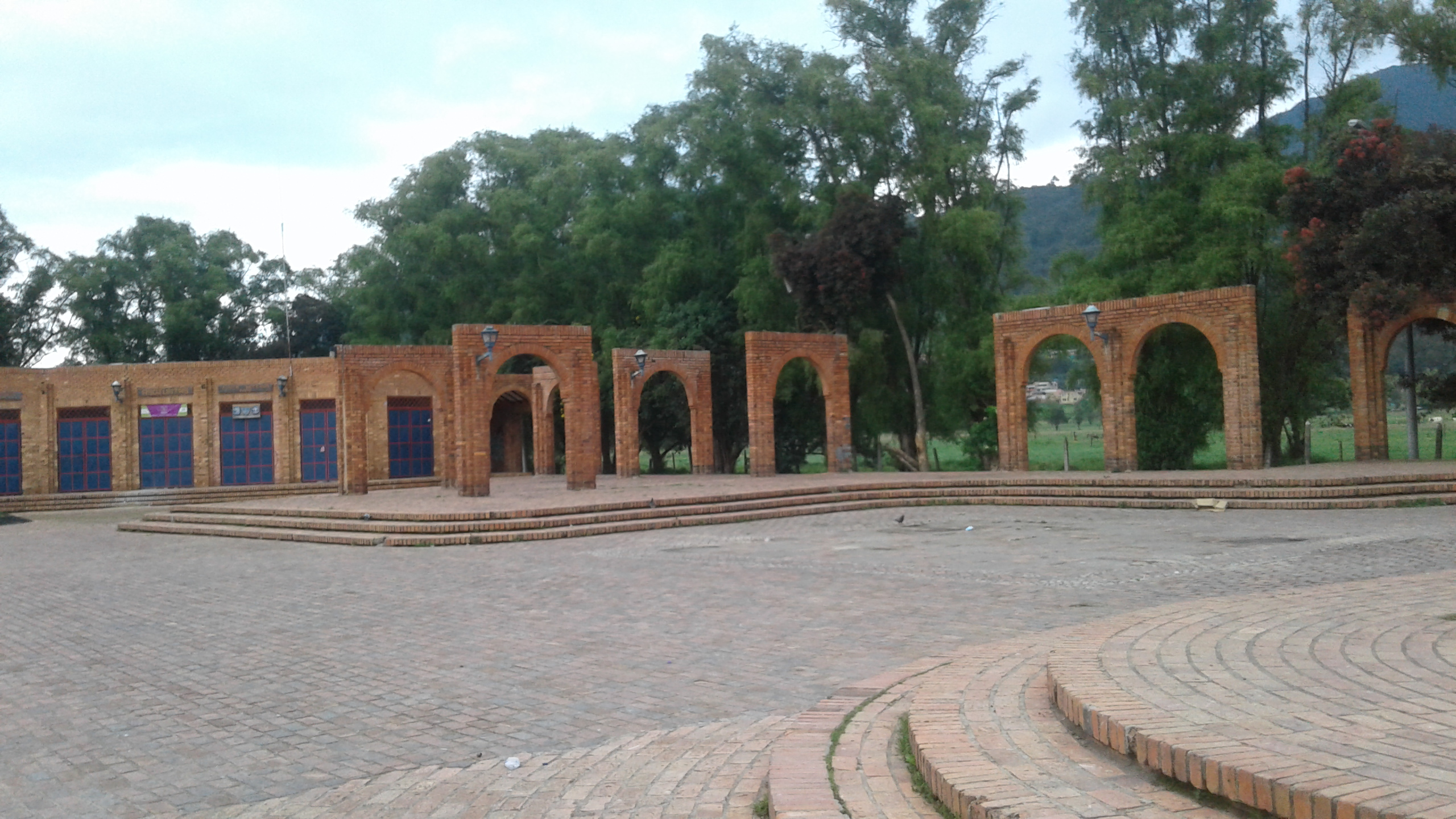
Municipal Forum

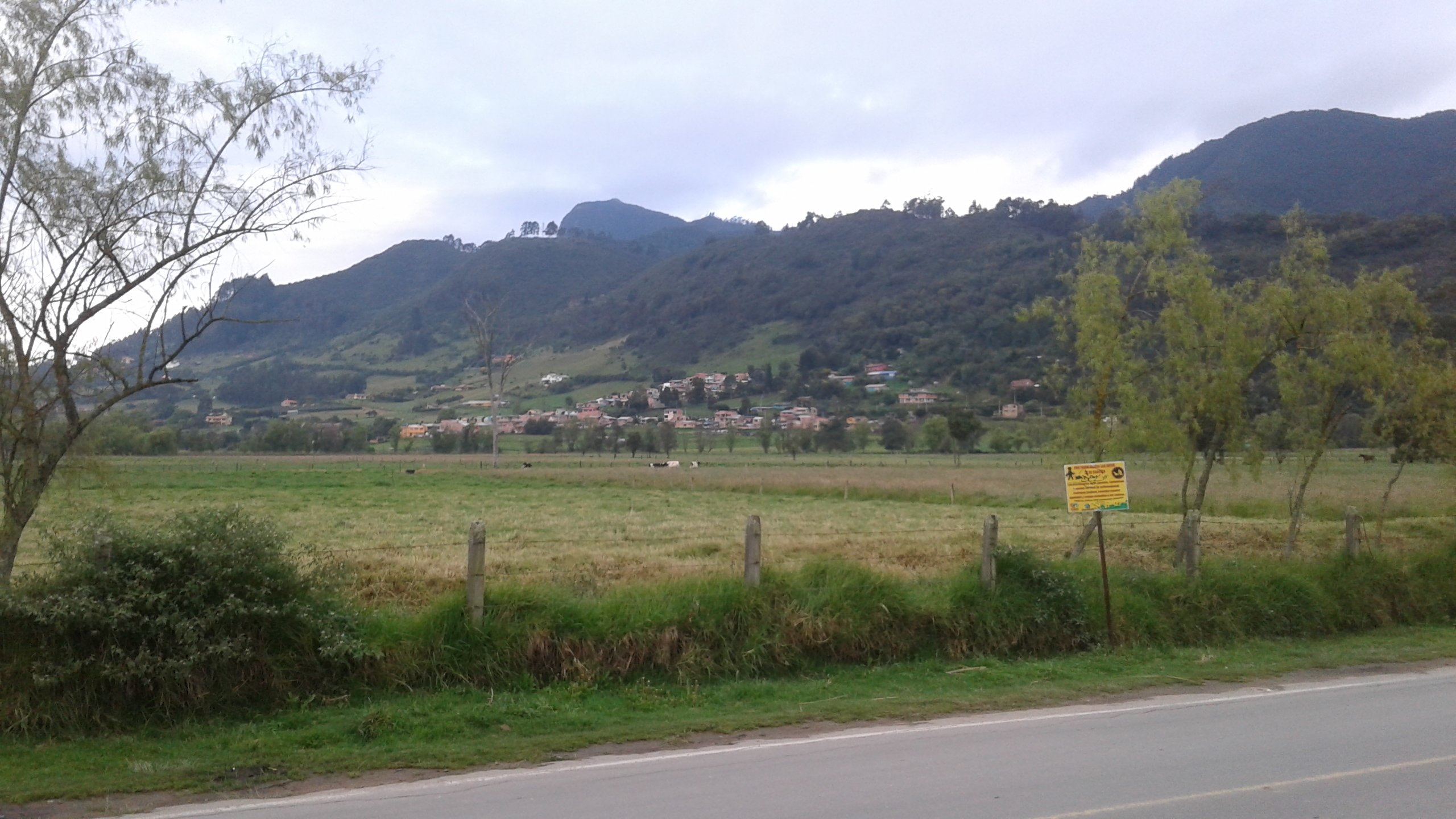
Tabio rural landscape

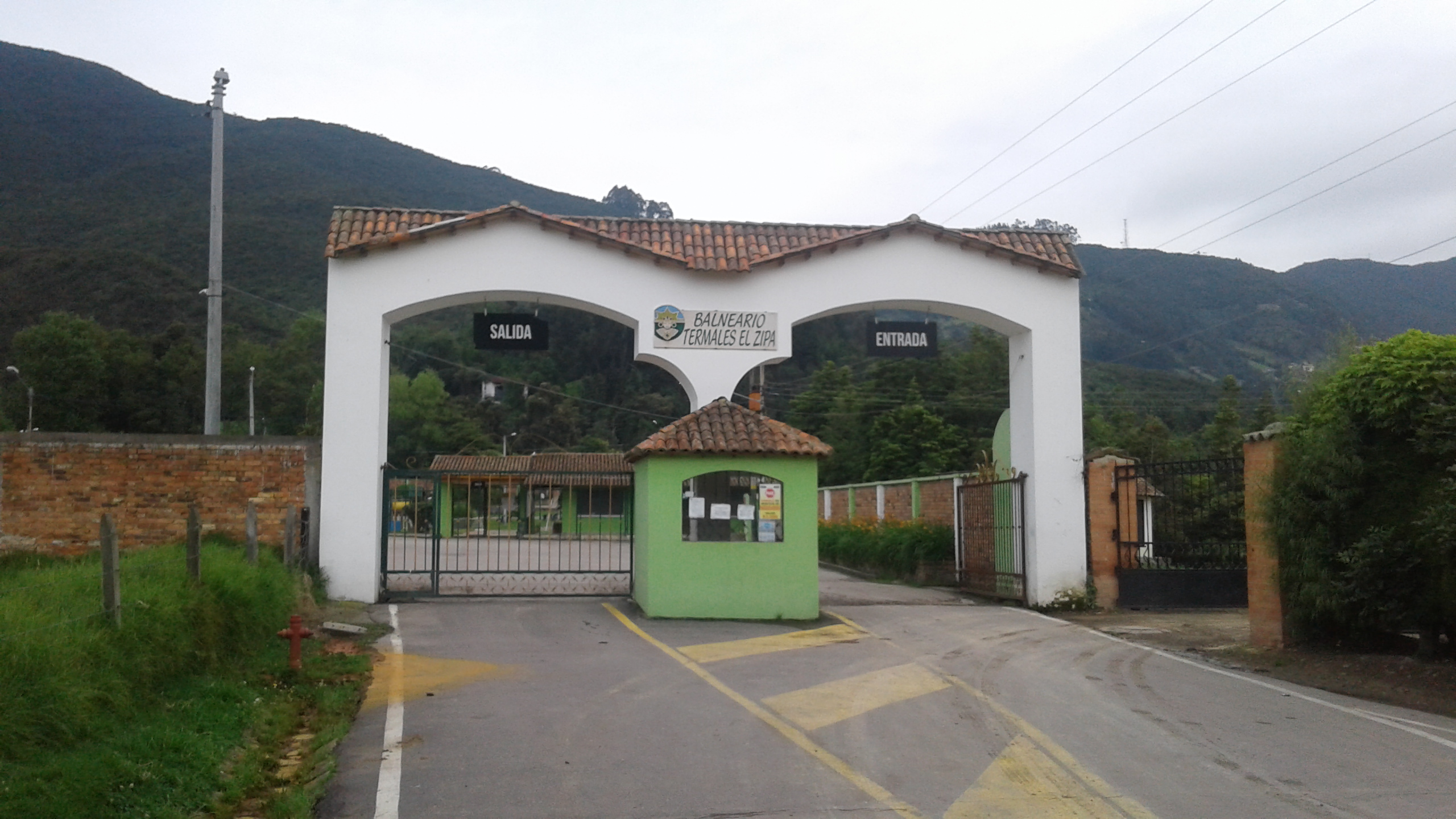
Hot springs
