= Cajicá =

- Municipality and town
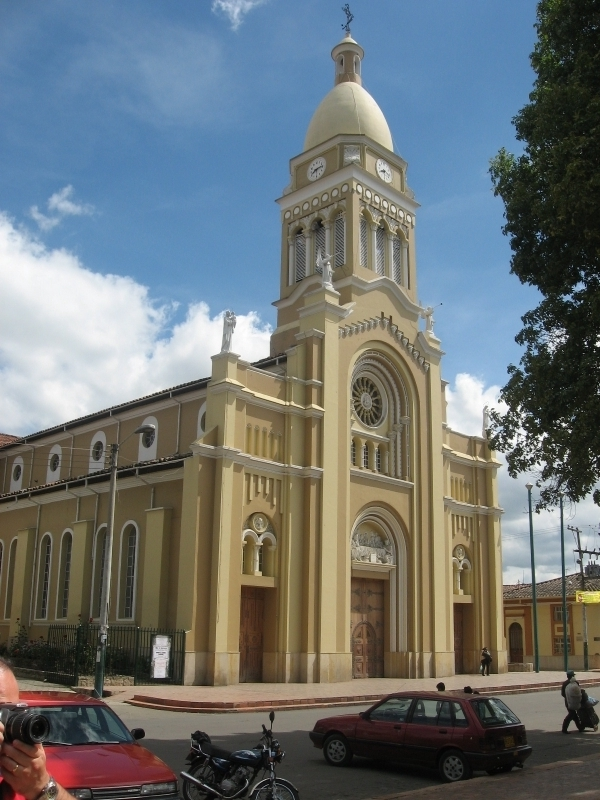
- Church of Cajicá

- Flag Coat of arms
- Nickname: Fortaleza de Piedra ("The Stone Fortress")
- Location of the town and municipality of Cajicá in the department of Cundinamarca
- Coordinates: 4°55′N 74°02′W
- Country: Colombia
- Department: Cundinamarca
- Province: Central Savanna Province
- Founded: 5 March 1598

Government
  - Mayor: Fabiola Jácome Rincón (2024-2027)

Area
  - Municipality and town: 51.28 km^{2} (19.80 sq mi)
  - Urban: 5.82 km^{2} (2.25 sq mi)
- Elevation: 2,558 m (8,392 ft)

Population (2018 census)
  - Municipality and town: 82,244
  - Density: 1,604/km^{2} (4,154/sq mi)
  - Urban: 54,111
  - Urban density: 9,300/km^{2} (24,100/sq mi)
- Time zone: UTC-5 (Colombia standard time)
- Website: Official website

Cajicá is a municipality and town of Colombia in the department of Cundinamarca, 39 km (24 mi) north of the capital Bogotá. It is located in the Central Savanna Province, being the third most populous municipality in the province after Zipaquirá and Chía. It is bordered by the municipalities of Zipaquirá to the north, Sopó to the east, Chía to the south, and Tabio to the west. The town is located at an altitude of 2,558 metres (8,392 ft) and has an average temperature of 14 °C (57 °F).

== Etymology ==
The name of Cajicá derives from a corruption of the two words ca ("enclosure") and jica ("stone"). Primary sources have two meanings for Cajicá; either derived from the cacique Cajic, or the "stone enclosure" or "stone fortress".

== History ==
According to imagined history as described by Ángel Luís Román, the area of Cajicá, in the valley of Kaj was inhabited since approximately 12,460 BC.

The stone wall has been described to have been constructed in two phases; an early phase made of wooden poles and a second phase, built between around 1220 and 1400, out of stone, rare for the Muisca. The wall has been described to have been four meters high and 80 centimeters thick. The Muisca fortress was said to be located strategically on the Bogotá savanna between Funza and Fusagasugá in the south and the road to the regions in the north (Boyacá and Santander) roughly on the site known today as Las Manas. Rituals were allegedly performed by the merchants and soldiers travelling through the valley on the road between Zipaquirá and Tabio. It however remains unclear if this stone fortress was built in pre-Columbian time or after the Spanish conquest.

Supposedly at this site the vanguard of the conquistador army of Gonzalo Jiménez de Quesada first encountered the Muisca on March 23, 1537.

A description of Cajicá from 1593 lists a population of 776 indigenous people. The date of the Spanish foundation of the town is considered to be March 5, 1598 when Juan de Hoyo began the construction of the first church of brick, under the orders of Miguel de Ibarra. Both the original and successive churches were destroyed by earthquakes: the town's present church started construction towards the end of the 19th century and completed in 1930.

== Economy ==
Some 75% of the land of the present day municipality is used for agriculture, but the town also derives a sizeable proportion of its income as a nearby country retreat for wealthy Bogotanos, including country villas and high-end restaurants.

== Gallery ==
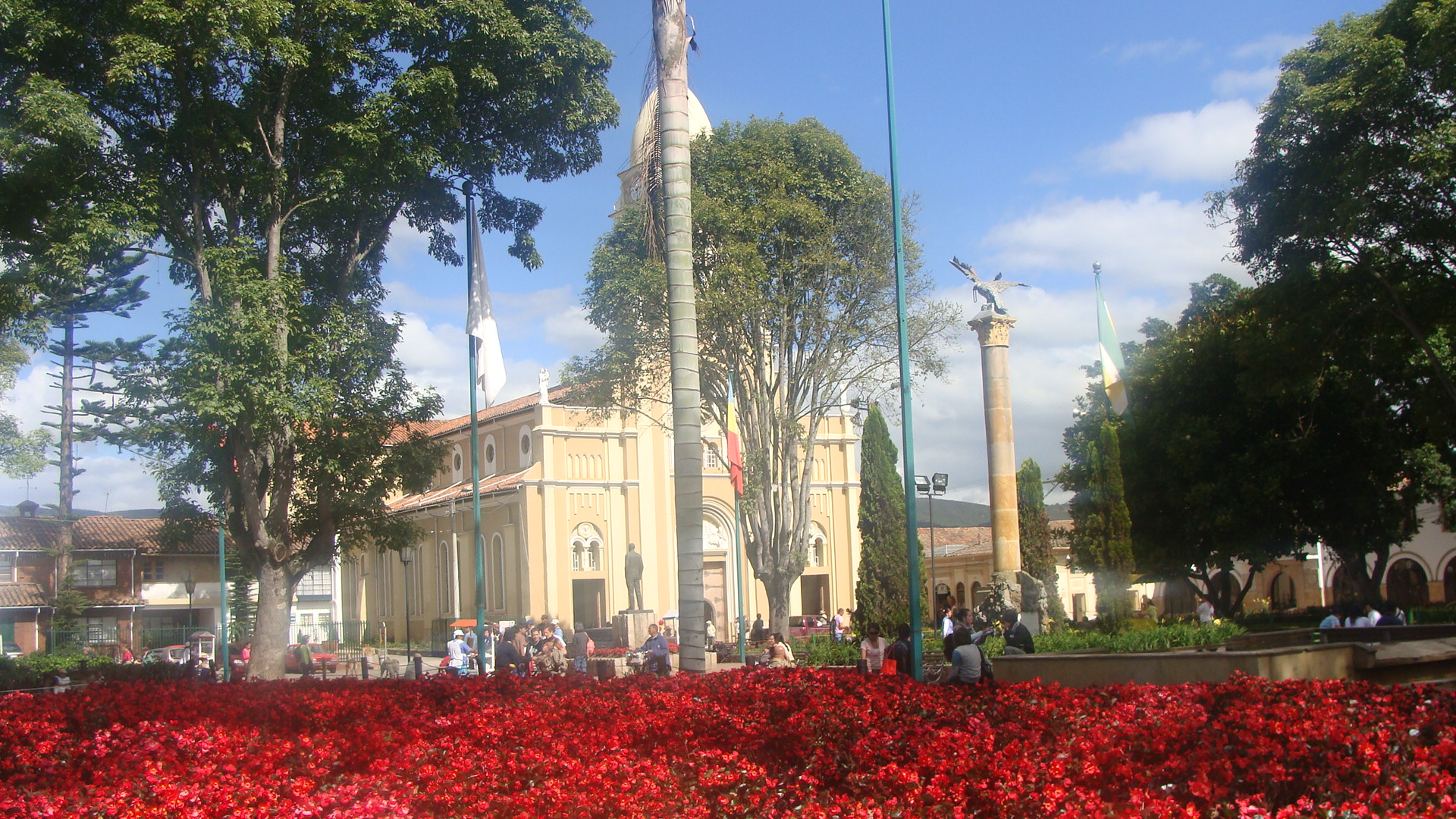
Central square Cajicá

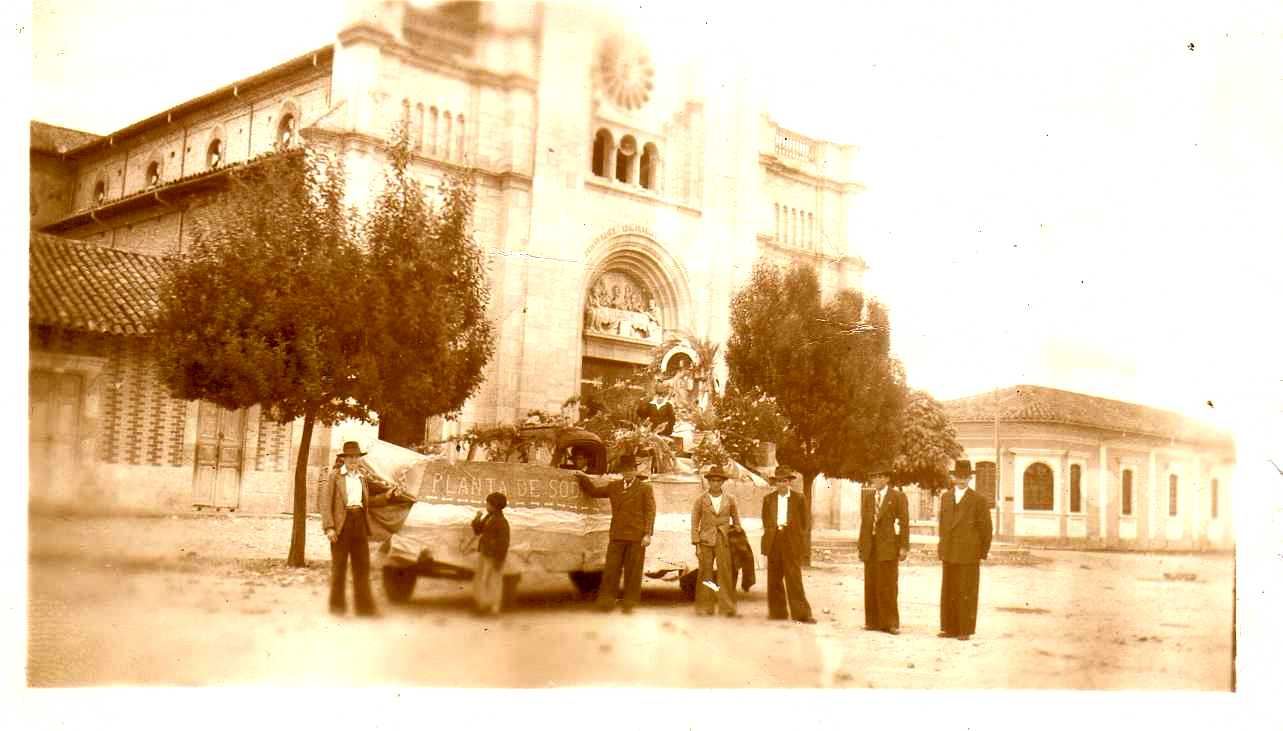
Church of Cajicá in the 1950s

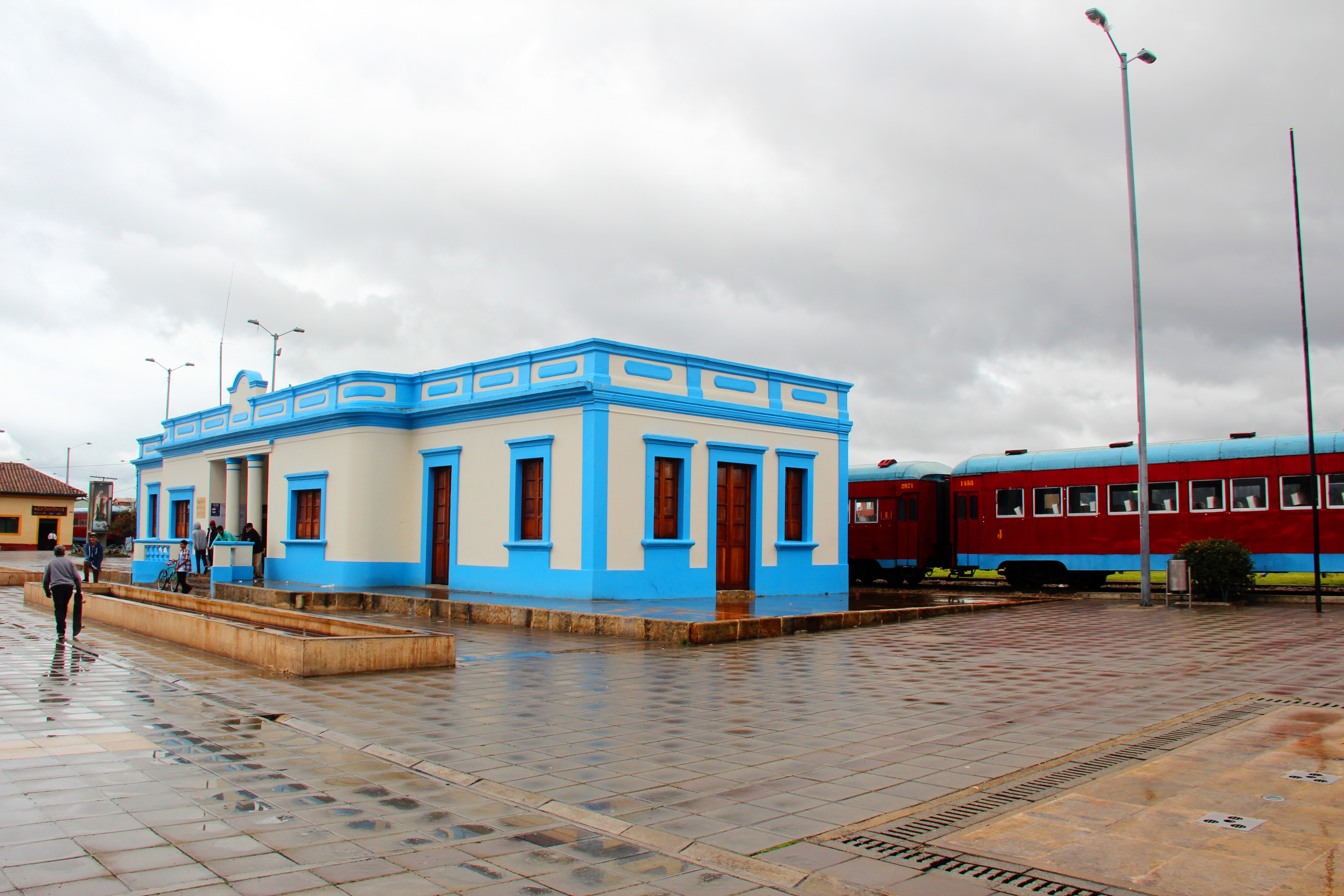
Train station Cajicá
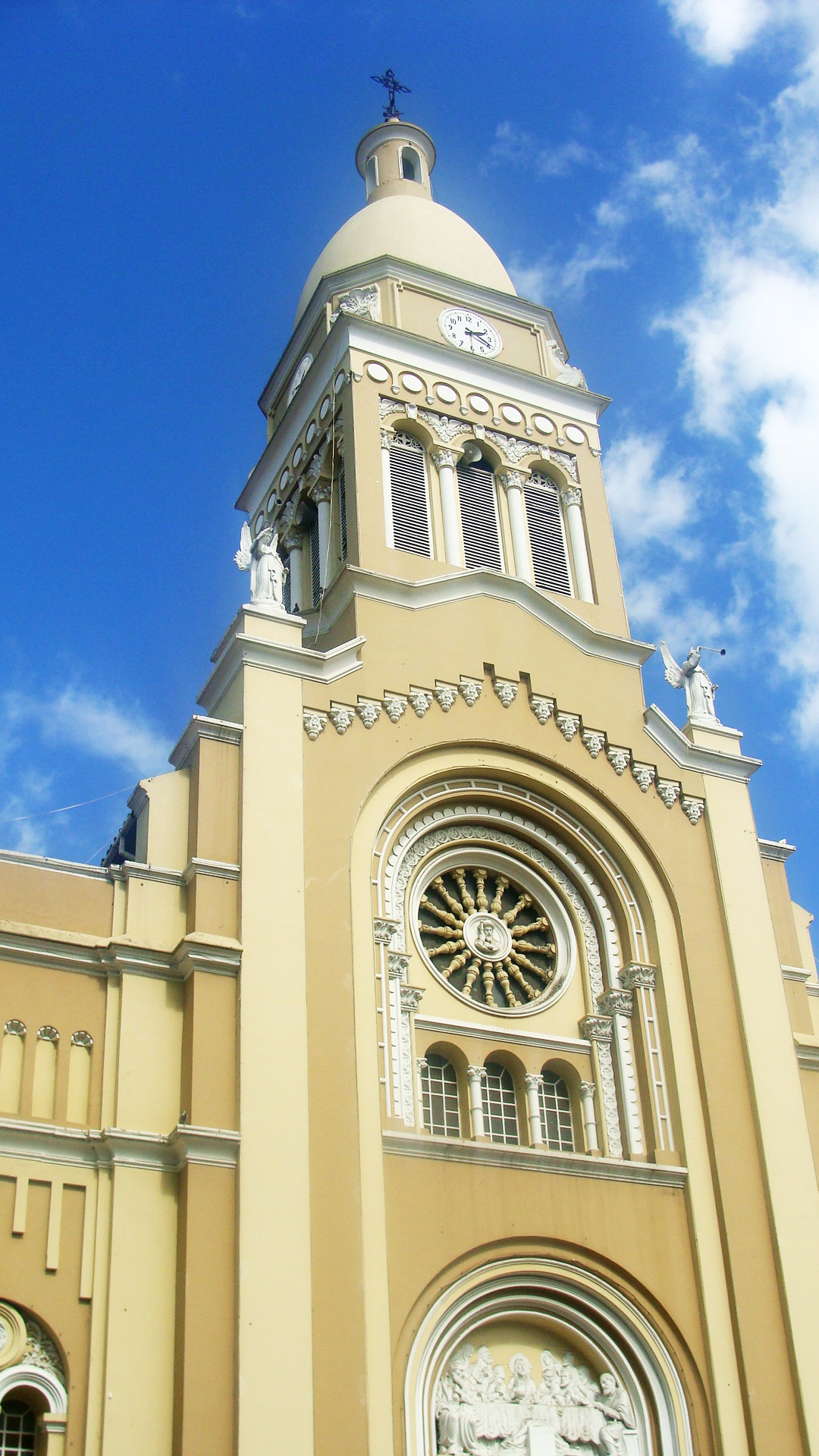
Church Cajicá

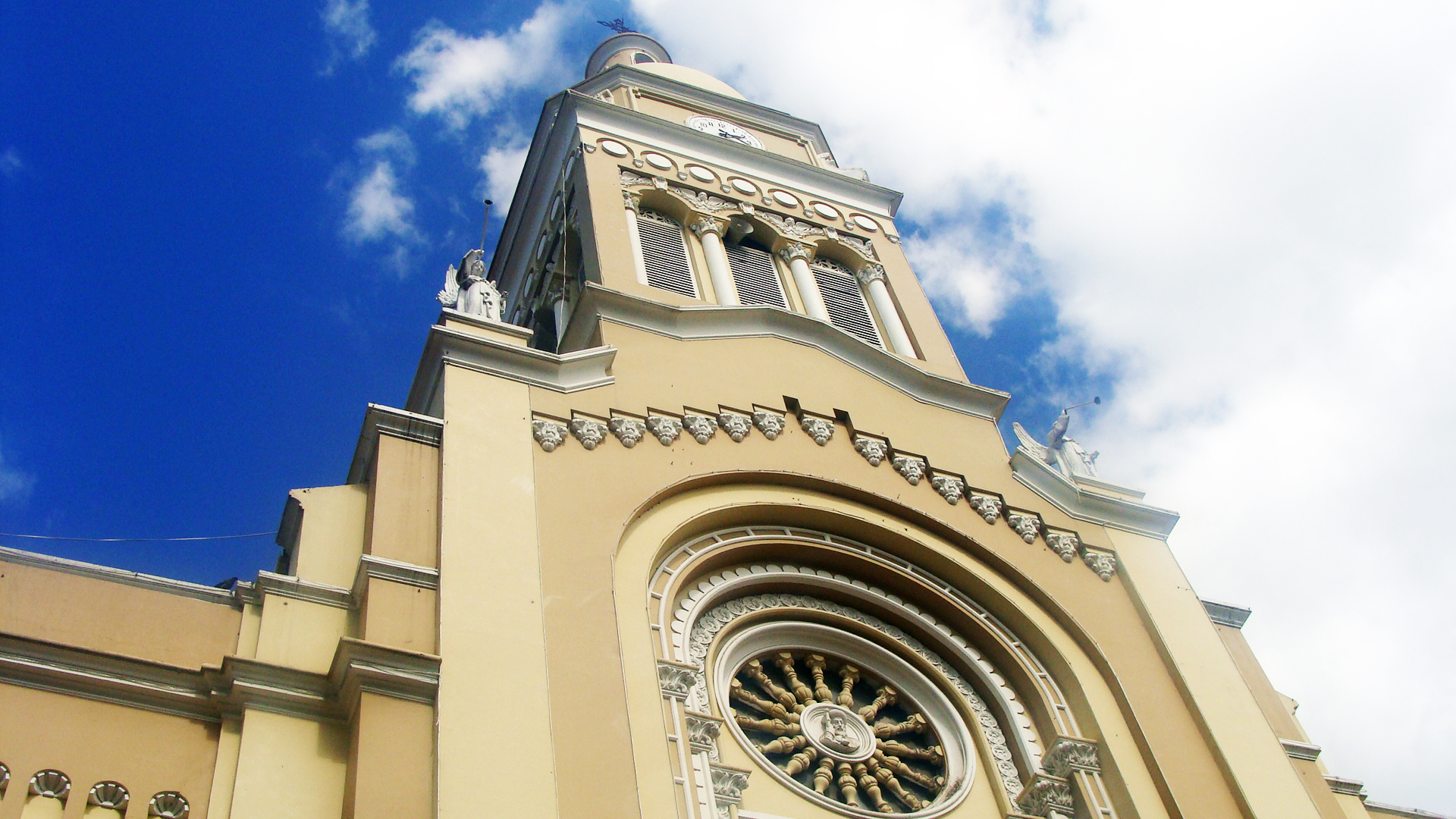
Church tower

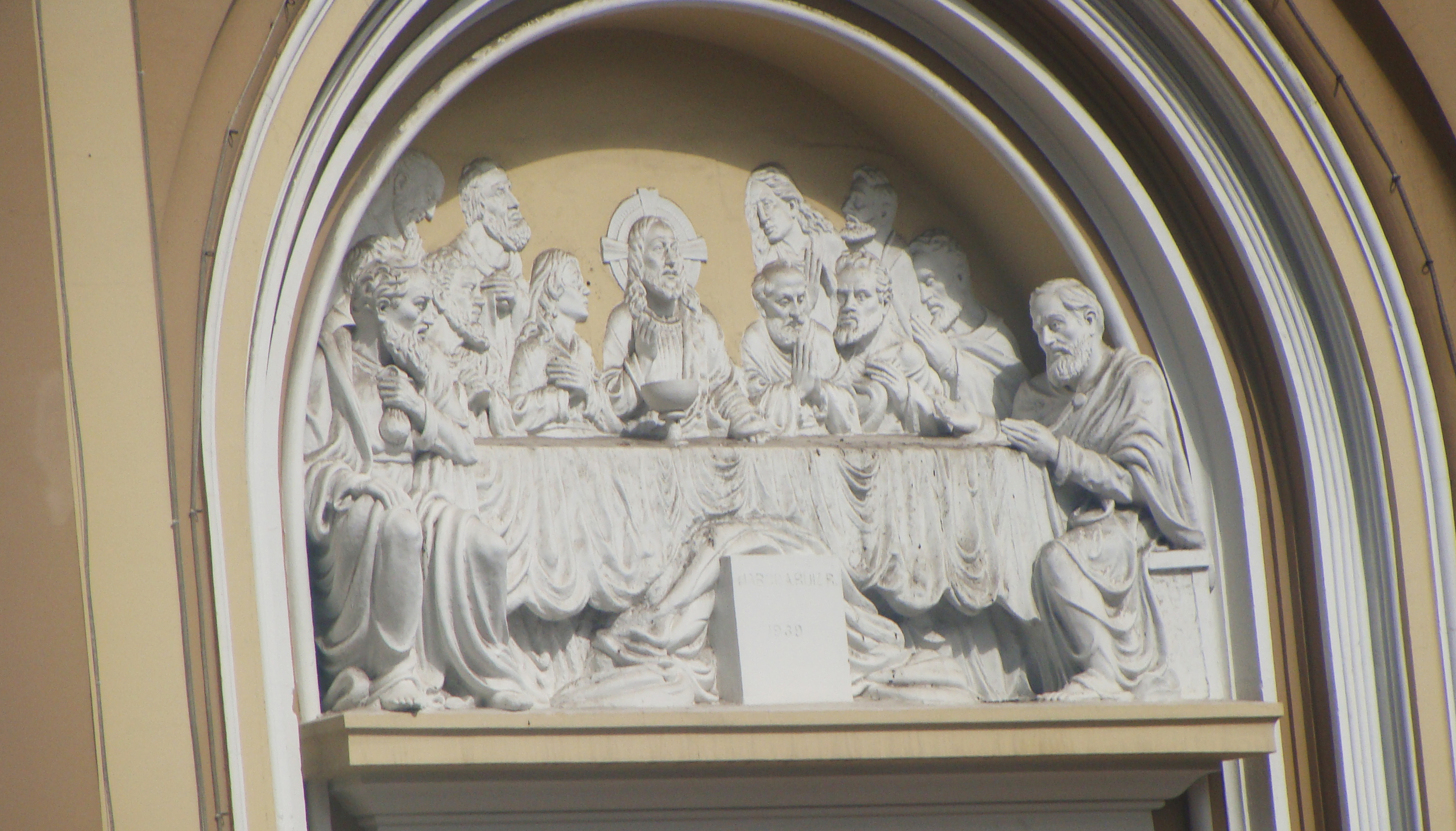
Church front detail

== Bibliography ==
- Román, Ángel Luís (2008), Necesidades fundacionales e historia indígena imaginada de Cajicá: una revisión de esta mirada a través de fuentes primarias (1593-1638) - Foundational needs and imagined indigenous history of Cajicá: a review of this look using primary sources (1593-1638) (PDF) (in Spanish), Bogotá, Colombia: Universidad de los Andes, pp. 276–313
