= 2008 El Calvario earthquake =

Earthquake in Colombia

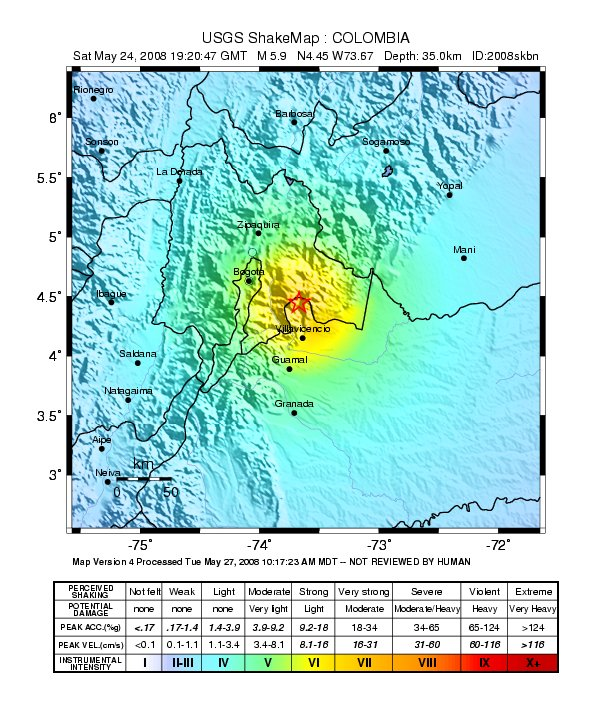

- Location within Colombia
- UTC time: 2008-05-24 19:20:43
- ISC event: 13229681
- USGS-ANSS: ComCat
- Local date: 24 May 2008
- Local time: 14:20:43 COT
- Magnitude: 5.9 M_{w}
- Depth: 35 kilometres (22 mi)
- Epicenter: 4.447°N 73.670°W
- Areas affected: Colombia
- Max. intensity: MMI VII (Very strong)
- Casualties: 11 dead 4,181 injured

The 2008 El Calvario earthquake occurred in central Colombia on 24 May and measured 5.9 on the moment magnitude scale. The earthquake occurred at 2:20:43 p.m. (19:20:43 UTC) at the epicenter (El Calvario, Meta). The depth was 35 km; it was superficial according to an Ingeominas report. The epicenter was located 35 km from Villavicencio and 50 km from Bogotá. There were 11 confirmed fatalities and 4,181 injured, mostly in the towns of Puente Quetame, Fosca, Fomeque and Guayabetal in Cundinamarca, and in El Calvario, Meta.

A M4 foreshock occurred at 12:08 local time (17:08 UTC) near San Juanito, in the Meta Central Department, at a depth of 30 km.

The town of Quetame, Cundinamarca was the most affected. Several houses collapsed in this small town of 6,500 inhabitants. The reconstruction of the affected structures cost 10 million USD (exchange rate COP 2000). In Bogotá, a partial collapse of the building of "Lotería de Bogotá" was reported, with no major consequences. The emergency network in the Capital District was put on maximum alert. A collapse of fixed phone lines and cell phones occurred, due to the great number of people calling to find out about their relatives. The quake was also felt in cities as far away as Medellín and Bucaramanga.

In Guayabetal, Cundinamarca, civil defense workers could only reach the town from Villavicencio using motorcycles, because fallen buildings blocked cars from passing. The workers found two people dead and another 26 people trapped in a bus. Now there is a bypass to that point coming from Villavicencio, because 2 km of Highway 48 was closed due to fallen debris.

== See also ==
- List of earthquakes in 2008
- List of earthquakes in Colombia
