= Cora barbifera =

Scientific classification
- Kingdom: Fungi
- Division: Basidiomycota
- Class: Agaricomycetes
- Order: Agaricales
- Family: Hygrophoraceae
- Genus: Cora
- Species: C. barbifera

Binomial name
- Cora barbifera B.Moncada, Patiño & Lücking (2016)

Species of lichen

Cora barbifera is a rare species of basidiolichen in the family Hygrophoraceae. It was formally described as a new species in 2016 by Bibiana Moncada, Ayda Lucía Patiño, and Robert Lücking. The specific epithet barbifera refers to the dense setae on the thallus surface, which somewhat resembles a beard. The lichen is known to occur only at the type locality in the páramo of Cerro Negro, Colombia, where it grows as an epiphyte on páramo shrubs. Cora hirsuta and C. schizophylloides are closely related species.

== Taxonomy ==
Cora barbifera is a basidiolichen in the family Hygrophoraceae (order Agaricales). It was described in 2016 by Bibiana Moncada, Angela Patiño, and Robert Lücking from material collected on páramo shrubs at Cerro Negro, Nariño Department, Colombia. The specific epithet—Latin for 'bearing a beard'—refers to the conspicuous bands of outward-pointing setae that give the lobes a bearded appearance. Molecular data from the internal transcribed spacer region place the species near the setose species C. hirsuta and C. schizophylloides, though it lacks the medullary papillae seen in those relatives.

== Description ==
The thallus of Cora barbifera is epiphytic and macrosquamulose, forming rosettes up to 2 cm across on stems of páramo shrubs. It comprises three to five semicircular lobes, each 0.5–1 cm long and wide, that lie flat to slightly ascending and branch irregularly without distinct radial sutures. Fresh lobes are olive-green, mottled with whitish patches, and bordered by thin, rolled-in (involute) margins that are grey to light olive and sparsely pilose; dried material turns brownish-grey. The upper surface is uneven to granulose when moist, becoming wrinkled (rugose) on drying, and is ornamented with concentric bands of densely packed, outward-directed setae. The lower surface lacks a cortex (it is ecorticate) and has a whitish, felty-arachnoid medulla.

Sections reveal a thallus 200–300 micrometres (μm) thick. A loosely organised upper cortex 20–30 μm deep overlies a 50–100 μm zone of anticlinal hyphae; bundles of agglutinated hyphae form stout setae 70–100 μm long and 15–20 μm wide at the base. The photobiont layer is 50–100 μm thick and aeruginous-green, while the medulla is 30–70 μm thick; clamp connections and papilliform hyphae are absent. A hymenophore has not been observed, and thin-layer chromatography detected no secondary metabolites.

== Habitat and distribution ==
Cora barbifera is so far known only from the wet páramo above 3,000 m elevation at Cerro Negro, southern Colombia. It grows epiphytically on the twigs and stems of páramo shrubs in cool, mist-laden conditions where rapid wet-dry cycles and high ultraviolet radiation prevail.
