= Quetame =

- Municipality and town
- Flag Coat of arms

- Location of the municipality and town inside Cundinamarca Department of Colombia

- Location in Colombia
- Coordinates: 4°19′49″N 73°51′46″W
- Country: Colombia
- Department: Cundinamarca
- Province: Eastern Province
- Founded: 26 June 1826
- Founder: Josè Joaquin Guarín

Government
  - Mayor: Elizabeth Sabogal Velásquez (2024–2027)

Area
  - Municipality and town: 138.47 km^{2} (53.46 sq mi)
  - Urban: 0.29 km^{2} (0.11 sq mi)
- Elevation: 1,496 m (4,908 ft)

Population (2015)
  - Municipality and town: 7,141
  - Density: 51.57/km^{2} (133.6/sq mi)
  - Urban: 1,609
- Time zone: UTC-5 (Colombia Standard Time)
- Website: Official website

Quetame is a municipality and town of Colombia in the Eastern Province, part of the department of Cundinamarca. The urban centre of Quetame is located at 62 kilometres (39 mi) from the capital Bogotá at an altitude of 1,496 metres (4,908 ft). The municipality borders Fómeque in the north, Fosca and Cáqueza in the west, the department of Meta in the east and in the south with Guayabetal.

== Etymology ==
The name Quetame comes from Chibcha and means "Our farmfields on the mountains".

== History ==
In the times before the Spanish conquest, Quetame was inhabited by the Muisca. Quetame was loyal to the cacique of Ubaque.

Modern Quetame was founded on June 26, 1826, by Josè Joaquin Guarín.

== Economy ==
Main economical activity of Quetame is agriculture with products beans, sagú, maize, peas, arracacha and others.

== Earthquake ==
On May 24, 2008, there was a magnitude 5.5 earthquake with its epicentre in Quetame that caused at least 3 deaths and destroyed 40% of the buildings in the village. The tremor was also felt in Bogotá and Villavicencio.
