= Sumapaz =

- Locality of Bogotá
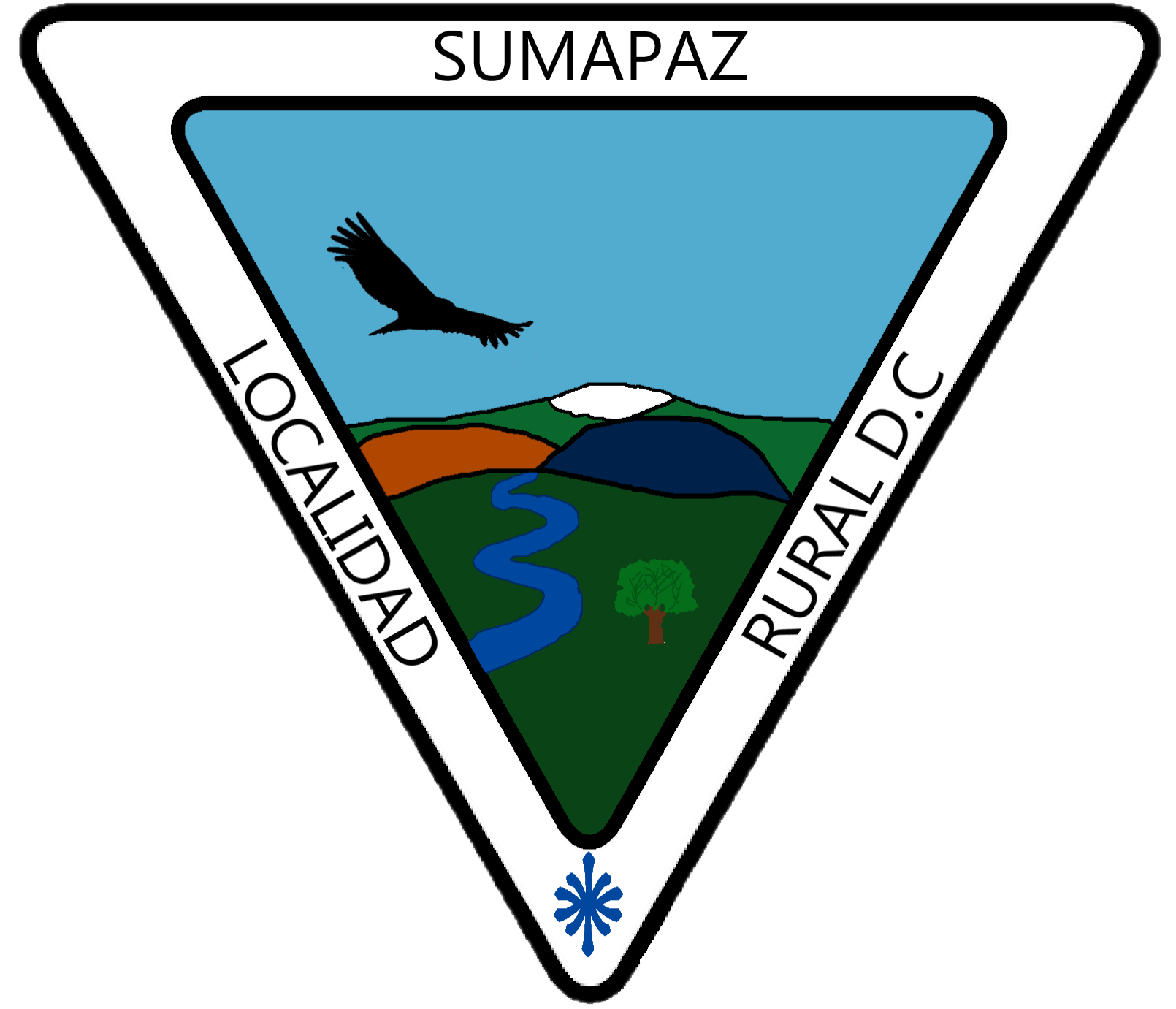
- Coat of arms

- Location of the locality in the Capital District of Bogotá
- Coordinates: 4°15′36″N 74°10′42″W
- Country: Colombia
- City: Bogotá D.C.

Area
  - Total: 780.96 km^{2} (301.53 sq mi)
- Elevation: 3,500 m (11,500 ft)

Population (2007)
  - Total: 5,667
  - Density: 7.256/km^{2} (18.79/sq mi)
- Time zone: UTC-5 (Colombia Standard Time)
- Website: Official website

Sumapaz is the 20th locality of Bogotá, capital of Colombia. It is the largest of Bogotá's 20 localities, starting in the north at the edge of the urban frontier with Usme and stretching to the south at the border of Cundinamarca with the departments of Meta and Huila. It is completely rural, with no city services.

== History ==
The Sumapaz Páramo, covering most of the locality, was a sacred site for the indigenous Muisca in pre-Columbian times. In the 16th century, it was discovered by conquistadors led by Nicolaus Federmann in their quest for El Dorado.

It has been the stage for several rural conflicts, including those of 1928 and 1946. La Violencia of 1948 gave rise to the formation of the guerrilla groups still present in Colombia. At the beginning of the 21st century, the Colombian army took the territory from guerrilla hands as part of a counter-guerrilla strategy of president Álvaro Uribe.

== Economy ==
The population is dependent on small-scale farming and livestock.

== General information ==
=== Borders ===
- North: The locality of Usme
- East: The municipalities of Une and Gutiérrez and the department of Meta
- South: The department of Huila
- West: The municipalities of Cabrera, Venecia, San Bernardo, Arbeláez, and Pasca

=== Hydrology ===
Within the borders of the locality, several rivers are formed, mostly within Sumapaz National Park. The two largest rivers are the Pilar and Sumapaz River, the latter flowing into the Magdalena River.

=== Points of interest ===
- Sumapaz National Park
- Ecoparque Chinauta
