= Fosca, Cundinamarca =

Fosca
- Municipality and town
- Flag

- Location of the municipality and town inside Cundinamarca Department of Colombia

- Location in Colombia
- Coordinates: 4°20′N 73°56′W
- Country: Colombia
- Department: Cundinamarca
- Province: Eastern Province
- Founded: uncertain
- Founder: uncertain, see text

Government
  - Mayor: Milton Albino Barbosa Rey (2016–2019)

Area
  - Municipality and town: 126.02 km^{2} (48.66 sq mi)
  - Urban: 0.19 km^{2} (0.073 sq mi)
- Elevation: 2,080 m (6,820 ft)

Population (2015)
  - Municipality and town: 7,524
  - Density: 59.70/km^{2} (154.6/sq mi)
  - Urban: 1,916
- Time zone: UTC-5 (Colombia Standard Time)
- Website: Official website

Fosca is a municipality and town of Colombia in the Eastern Province, part of the department of Cundinamarca. It is located in the Ubaque Valley with the urban centre at a distance of 62 kilometres (39 mi) from the capital Bogotá at an altitude of 2,080 metres (6,820 ft). Fosca borders Cáqueza and Une in the north, Quetame in the east, Guayabetal in the south and Gutiérrez in the west.

== History ==
In the time before the Spanish conquest, Fosca was inhabited by the Mau or Maco and Guaypi or Buchipa indigenous tribe. The Muisca, living north from the area, had a fortification of guecha warriors stationed in Fosca to defend themselves from the Guayupe people who inhabited the region south of Fosca.

About the discovery and foundation of Fosca three different versions are given; Nikolaus Federmann would have founded the town on September 1, 1538, captain Pedro de Limpias reached and discovered Fosca on his expedition from the Llanos Orientales on February 5, 1538, or Juan de Valcárcel passed through the area and moved the town centre to a different location on February 5, 1627.

== Economy ==
The economy of Fosca is concentrated around agriculture and livestock farming. Main agricultural products cultivated are maize, potatoes, coffee, arracacha, beans and peas.

== Bibliography ==
- Rodríguez de Montes, María Luisa (2002), Los güechas o guechas en Cundinamarca - The guecha warriors in Cundinamarca (in Spanish), pp. 1633–1646
