= Eastern Province, Cundinamarca =

Eastern Province Provincia de Oriente
- Province
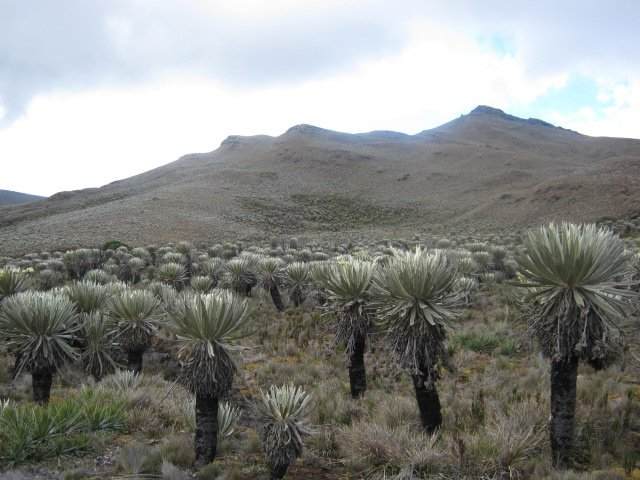
- Páramo de Cruz Verde, Chipaque
- Etymology: Eastern part of Cundinamarca
- Location of Eastern Province in Colombia
- Coordinates: 4°24′19″N 73°56′52″W
- Country: Colombia
- Department: Cundinamarca
- Capital: Cáqueza
- Municipalities: 10

Area
  - Total: 2,215.51 km^{2} (855.41 sq mi)

Population (2015)
  - Total: 87,446
  - Density: 39.470/km^{2} (102.23/sq mi)
- Time zone: UTC−05:00 (COT)
- Indigenous groups: Muisca; Guayupe

Eastern Province is one of the 15 provinces in the Cundinamarca Department, Colombia.

== Subdivision ==
The Eastern Province is subdivided into 10 municipalities:

Municipality bold is capital	Area km^{2}	Elevation (m) urban centre	Population 2015	Founded	Map
Cáqueza	38	1746	17,048	1600	
Chipaque	139.45	2400	8400	1600	
Choachí	223	1923	10,729	1560	
Fómeque	555.7	1895	12,214	1593	
Fosca	126.02	2080	7524	uncertain	
Guayabetal	141.91	1270	4931	1941	
Gutiérrez	527	2350	4097	1816	
Quetame	138.47	1496	7141	1826	
Ubaque	104.96	1867	6166	1651	
Une	221	2376	9196	1538	
Total	2215.51		87,446		
