= Une =

- Municipality
- Une
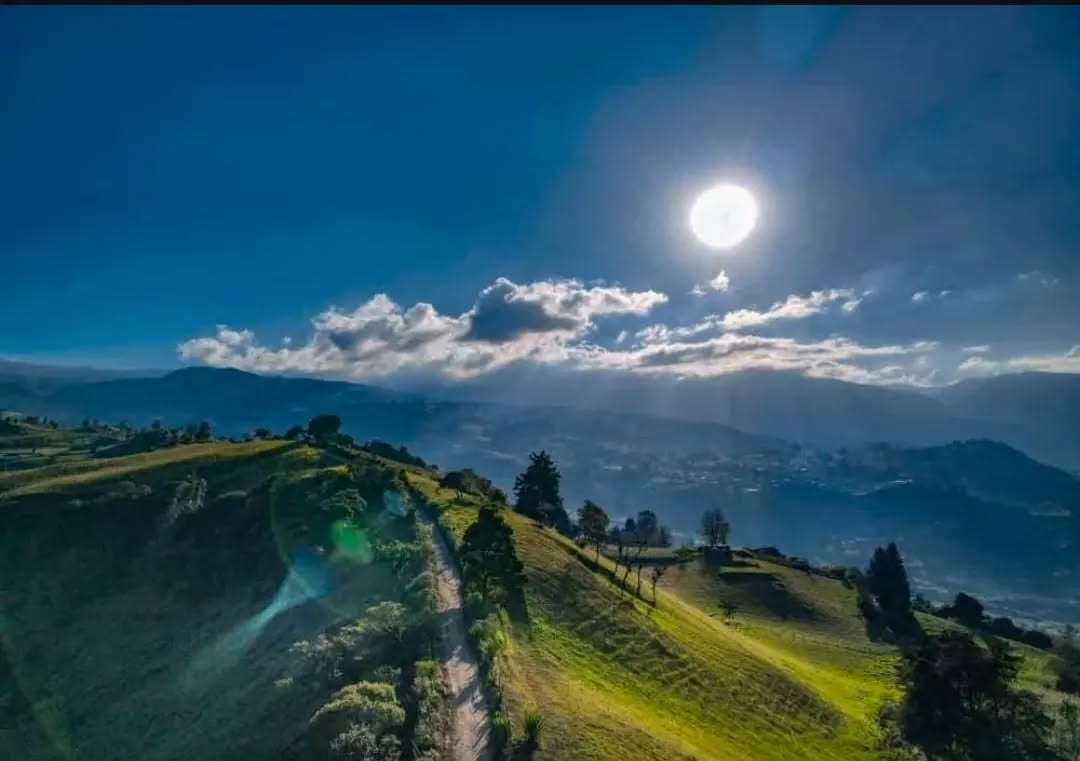
- Aerial view of rural roads in Une

- Flag Seal

- Location of Une in Cundinamarca Department

- Location in Colombia
- Coordinates: 4°24′7″N 74°1′31″W
- Country: Colombia
- Department: Cundinamarca
- Province: Eastern Province
- Founded: February 22, 1538
- Municipal status: January 3, 1779
- Founder: Diego Romero de Aguilar

Government
  - Mayor: Álvaro Gómez Rico (2024-2027)

Area
  - Municipality: 211 km^{2} (81 sq mi)
- Elevation: 2,376 m (7,795 ft)

Population (2024)
  - Municipality: 8,330
  - Density: 39.5/km^{2} (102/sq mi)
  - Urban: 3,938
- Time zone: UTC-5 (COT)
- Postal code: 251845
- Area code: +57 1
- Website: www.une-cundinamarca.gov.co

Une is a municipality in the Cundinamarca Department, Colombia, located in the Eastern Province. It is situated 27 miles (43 km) southeast of Bogotá, the country's capital.

Considered one of the oldest municipalities in Cundinamarca, Une is notable for having the shortest name in the department, consisting of only three letters.

== Etymology ==
=== Linguistic origin ===
- Language family: Chibchan
- Language: Muysccubun

=== Meaning ===
The toponym "Une" in Muysccubun (Muisca language) has several meanings according to historical sources:

1. "Pot" or "meeting center of the chiefdom" of Ubaque.
2. "Good thing," according to Acosta Ortegón's dictionary.
3. "Sky," according to other interpretations of the Chibchan language.

The toponym "Queca," name of a village (vereda) in the municipality, in the Muisca language (Quyca) means "earth," "world," or "territory." It is also related to the idea of "people" or "homeland" in the context of their culture.

== History ==
=== Pre-Columbian era ===
The territory of Une was part of the Ubaque Chiefdom in Muisca times, which belonged to the Muisca Confederation of Bacatá. The Muisca left important archaeological remains in the region, including rock art and petroglyphs that are still preserved in several villages throughout the municipality.

=== Colonial foundation (1538-1600) ===
The municipality was founded on February 22, 1538 by Diego Romero de Aguilar, a member of Gonzalo Jiménez de Quesada's expedition. He also served as its first encomendero.

In 1594, oidor Miguel de Ibarra recorded a population of 1,058 indigenous people. On June 19, 1600, Oidor Luis Enríquez determined through an order issued in Santafé to settle the indigenous people of Queca and Une in a single town, unifying the two communities.

=== Colonial development (1600-1779) ===
During this period, the first church was built with the help of mason Juan Robles, which was erected as a parish in 1692, with Juan de Dios Ramos as its first priest. The church was repaired in 1629 and 1630 at the request of visitor Lesmes de Espinosa, repairs that were approved by the Council of Castile counselor Juan de Valcárcel on January 12, 1630.

In 1779, according to the statistical report by Francisco Antonio Moreno y Escandón, the population consisted of 181 whites and 675 indigenous people. During this time, a hospital house was developed for the care of indigenous people.

=== Municipal status (1779) ===
On January 3, 1779, Une was officially established as a municipality, separating administratively from other colonial jurisdictions.

=== 19th century and early modernization ===
In 1898, the telegraph was inaugurated, marking the beginning of modern communications in the municipality. On July 26, 1936, the telephone was installed, significantly improving communications with the outside world.

The first night school dates from 1912, directed by Adriano Beltrán Pérez, established through City Council Agreement No. 1 of 1912.

==== Infrastructure construction ====
- 1916: Construction of the current church began on August 15, with the first stone laid by parish priest Luis Francisco Luque. The work was directed by master builder Antonio Camargo.
- 1922: On July 20, the municipal slaughterhouse was inaugurated.
- 1924: On June 13, electric lighting service was activated at 6 PM, produced by a municipal plant built by a Society of neighbors.
- 1928: Construction of the towers of the current church was completed, under the direction of Father Eugenio Celis.
- 1927–1932: The road to Caraza was built. The work was surveyed in 1927 by engineers Hernando Parra Lleras and Ezequiel Sánchez, with Dr. Ruperto Melo as Governor. It began on October 12, 1928, and was inaugurated on December 17, 1932.

=== 20th century educational development ===
In February 1941, the school was founded by professor Fidel Leal, an illustrious son of the municipality. The institution was private until 1946 and became municipal in 1947.

==== Educational timeline ====
- 1952: Primary sections and the first two years of high school were approved.
- 1961 and 1963: Third and fourth years of high school were approved respectively.
- 1963: Bernabé Riveros School was founded by Dr. Bernabé Riveros.
- 1968: On November 26, it merged with Bernabé Riveros School, becoming the "Integrated Departmental School Fidel Leal and Bernabé Riveros" of Une.
- 1973: On June 13, La Inmaculada School was integrated, founded in 1942 by the Discalced Carmelite Missionary Sisters.
- 1972: On July 4, basic secondary and vocational secondary education was officially approved.

=== Une in national context ===
Une participated in national historical events, being known during the Conservative-Liberal bipartisanship period as the "Red Star of the East" due to its liberal political tradition in a predominantly conservative region. During the Thousand Days' War, the municipality played an important role due to its strategic location on routes to the Eastern Plains.

== Geography ==
Une is located in the Eastern Province, on the foothills of the Eastern Cordillera. Its geographic position is approximately 4°24′7″N 74°1′31″W.

=== Boundaries ===
Une is bounded by Chipaque to the north; Cáqueza, Fosca, and Gutiérrez to the east; Gutiérrez and Bogotá to the south; and Bogotá and Chipaque to the west.

=== Physical characteristics ===
- Elevation: 7,795 feet (2,376 meters) above sea level
- Area: 81.5 square miles (211 km²)
- Average temperature: 61°F (16°C)
- Climate: Temperate mountain climate with two rainy seasons
- Hydrography: The municipality is crossed by the Negro River and has several water bodies, including the famous Chocolate Reservoir

=== Administrative division ===
==== Urban area ====
The municipal seat of Une consists of the following neighborhoods:

- Villa Natalia
- Villa Adriana
- Las Orquídeas
- El Danubio
- El Porvenir
- Villa de los Ángeles
- Urbanización Lina María
- Altos de Priscila

==== Population centers ====
Under its jurisdiction are the population centers of:

- Timasita: The most populated village with approximately 600 inhabitants, strategically located near the Bogotá–Villavicencio highway
- El Ramal

==== Villages (Veredas) ====
The municipality consists of 17 villages:

- Ramal
- Combura
- Queca (with important Muisca archaeological heritage)
- Bolsitas
- San Luis
- Mundo Nuevo
- Puente de Tierra
- El Salitre
- La Mesa
- Raspados
- San Isidro
- Llanitos
- Hoya de Carrillos
- Hoya de Pastores
- El Pedregal
- Mategá
- Timasita

== Demographics ==
According to DANE projections for 2024, Une has a population of 8,330 inhabitants: 3,938 women (47.3%) and 4,392 men (52.7%). This figure represents a slight decrease from the 9,196 inhabitants recorded in the 2015 census.

=== Age distribution (2024) ===
Population by age groups
Age group	Women	Men	Total	Percentage
Under 12 years	651	686	1,337	16.1%
12 to 17 years	367	379	746	9.0%
18 to 64 years	2,399	2,766	5,165	62.0%
65 years and over	521	561	1,082	13.0%
Total	3,938	4,392	8,330	100.0%

Une's inhabitants represent 0.23% of Cundinamarca's total population.

== Economy ==
=== Agriculture ===
Une's economy is mainly based on agriculture, standing out as one of the municipalities with the highest potato production in Colombia. Sixty percent of its area is dedicated to crops, with potato being the main product, followed by:

==== Main crops ====
- Potato: The product that supplies several municipalities in eastern Cundinamarca and part of Bogotá.
- Cilantro
- Onions
- Carrots
- Peas
- Corn
- Various vegetables

=== Primary sector ===
According to the National Federation of Potato Growers, Une is among the Cundinamarca municipalities with the greatest aptitude for potato cultivation, especially the Diacol Capiro variety destined for the processing industry.

=== Livestock ===
Livestock and dairy production are also important economic activities, especially the raising of Norman cattle, recognized at annual livestock fairs.

=== Tourism ===
In recent years, tourism has gained relevance as an economic activity, attracting visitors interested in:

- Rural and ecological tourism
- Cultural and heritage tourism
- Religious tourism
- Gastronomic tourism

== Cultural heritage ==
=== Rock art and archaeology ===
Une preserves important vestiges of Muisca rock art, including petroglyphs located in different villages of the municipality. Among the most important sites are:

- Timasita village petroglyphs: Three stones with red pictograms showing Muisca occupation of the territory.
- Petroglyphs in various villages, which form part of the archaeological legacy of the Cundiboyacense highlands.

=== Royal roads ===
Une preserves vestiges of the old colonial Royal Roads that connected Santafé de Bogotá with the Eastern Plains, constituting an important cultural heritage of the region.

=== Handicrafts ===
The municipality maintains artisanal traditions typical of Cundinamarca, especially:

- Textile in sheep wool
- Handicrafts in wood
- Traditional jewelry
- Leather work

== Municipal symbols ==
=== Coat of arms ===
The municipal coat of arms comprises a circle divided by two oblique lines, which when joined at the center represent the meaning of the municipality's name:

- Upper section: Sun's radiance and a tractor, symbolizing wealth, work, and agricultural mechanization. The blue borders represent the sky.
- Lower section: A gear representing industry and progress. It includes elements of rural life that provide development and sustenance to the municipality.
- Left side: A star and scales. The red background represents love for the homeland, and the scales symbolize equity and justice.
- Right side: A family representing rural lineage and family unity.
- Motto: "Land of Peace and Progress"

=== Flag ===
Consists of three horizontal stripes:

- Red: Love for the homeland
- White: Tranquility and peace
- 'Green: Goodness and fertility of its fields

=== Anthem ===
Anthem of Une
Authors and Chorus	Verses I-II	Verses III-IV
Authors; Lyrics: Pedro Medina Avendaño; Music: Raúl Rosero Polo Chorus; Une! Brother of sun and wind of calm and tempest, you are beautiful and complete monument to homeland and freedom. (Repeat)	I Morning dawns early in the river and the Rock dresses festively and the crowd seems like a cloud because revolution breaks out. II; It was once a brilliant warrior time and when Une marched to battle, Urías Romero's courage evoked the Cid's grace. (repeat)	III; To the rhythm of its open skies progress opens friendly in goodness, homes are warm harbors and cradles are promise and sway. IV; Our prodigal land gives us bread it is beautiful, tranquil and fertile, we say goodbye to war, with a hymn to work and peace.

== Tourist attractions ==
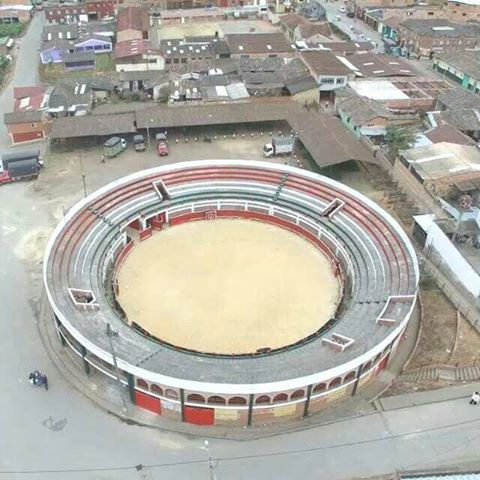
Leopoldo Romero Cubillos Bullring

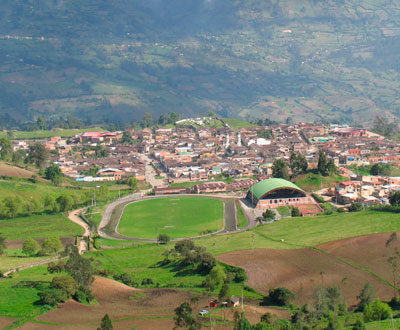
Gustavo Moya Ángel Sports Complex

Une offers various tourist attractions that combine nature, history, and culture:

=== Natural sites ===
- La Chorrera Waterfall: Crystal-clear waterfall born in the Sumapaz Páramo, in the San Salvador sector, with two tiers, the first 66 feet (20 meters) high
- Chocolate Reservoir: Magical water body surrounded by lush vegetation, perfect for landscape contemplation
- Sanctuary Cave: Rock formation of speleological interest
- Devil's Stone: Geological formation surrounded by popular legends

=== Historical and cultural sites ===
- Our Lady of Conception Parish: Construction began in 1916 and finished in 1928
- Calvary Hill: Viewpoint and pilgrimage site located in Villa Natalia neighborhood
- Old Royal Roads: Vestiges of colonial routes to the Plains
- Cultural Center: Hub for cultural and educational activities in the municipality
- Petroglyphs and indigenous rock art: In various villages throughout the municipality

=== Sports and recreation infrastructure ===
- Leopoldo Romero Cubillos Bullring: Coliseum where bullfighting and cultural events are held
- Gustavo Moya Ángel Sports Complex: Municipal sports complex
- Central park: Public space for recreation and citizen gatherings

== Festivals and events ==
=== Annual fair and festival ===
From December 12-16, the traditional Une Fair and Festival is celebrated, which includes:

- Musical shows with renowned artists
- Norman Cattle Exhibition: Livestock fair of the Norman breed
- Traditional events: Cavalcades, livestock market, and cultural activities
- Ox Team Exhibition: Traditional parades and competitions
- VIII Expo-Oriente Art: Regional art exhibition

=== Religious festivals ===
- Patron Saint Festival (December 7): In honor of the Immaculate Conception
- Festivals in honor of Saint Anthony of Padua
- Our Lady of Mount Carmel festivities

== Transportation and accessibility ==
=== Access routes ===
From Bogotá, Une can be accessed via two main routes:

1. Main route: Bogotá (Usme District) → National Route 40 → Chipaque → Une (27 miles/43 km, approximately 1 hour 30 minutes)

2. Alternative route: Via Une – Kilometer 19 (old route of 25 miles/40 km from Bogotá)

=== Public transportation ===
Transportation companies connecting Une with Bogotá and other municipalities include:

- Macarena
- Trans-Oriente
- Autollanos
- Cootras-Une Taxis
- Sootrans Juan XXIII Taxis

== Government ==
=== Municipal government ===
The municipality is administered by:

- 9 city councilors
- Community action boards
- Municipal public officials

=== Recent mayors ===
Municipal mayors since 2000
Term	Mayor
2024-2027	Álvaro Gómez Rico
2020-2023	Fredy Alonso Cubillos Poveda
2016-2019	Yecith Efrén Ángel Romero
2012-2015	José Luis Celeita Acosta
2008-2011	Adriana Ramírez Suárez
2004-2007	Leopoldo Romero Cubillos
2000-2003	Sonia Mercedes Criollo Alejo
1998-2000	Ángel María Criollo Cruz

== Education ==
=== Public education ===
Public education is mainly provided by the Fidel Leal and Bernabé Riveros Departmental Educational Institution, which achieved an average ICFES score of 255 in 2024.

==== Educational structure ====
IED Fidel Leal and Bernabé Riveros - Campuses
Campus	Grades
Main Campus	6th to 11th
Pedro Elíseo Campus	3rd to 5th
Alianza Campus	1st and 2nd
Kindergarten Campus	Pre-K, Kindergarten, and Preschool
Village schools	1st to 5th

The institution has 9 rural schools located in the villages: La Mesa, Sagrado Corazón, San Luis, Salitre, Raspados, Timasita, Combura, Puente Tierra, and Queca.

=== Private education ===
- Santa Teresita Modern School
- John Dalton School

=== Educational history ===
The main institution was founded in 1941 by professor Fidel Leal, operating as a private establishment until 1946. In 1968, it merged with Bernabé Riveros School, and in 1973, La Inmaculada School was integrated.

== Health services ==
=== Health services ===
The municipality has the Timoteo Riveros Cubillos Health Center ESE of Une, which provides first-level care services.

=== Doctor in Your Territory Program ===
Since 2024, Une benefits from the departmental program "Doctor in Your Territory" of the Cundinamarca Governorate, which guarantees:

- 24-hour medical care 7 days a week
- Specialized consultations in gynecology, pediatrics, and internal medicine
- Telemedicine services with higher complexity hospitals

== Public services ==
=== Administration ===
The public services of water supply, sewerage, and waste management are handled by the Office of Public Services for Water Supply, Sewerage, and Waste Management of the Municipality of Une Cundinamarca, directed by Leidy Mariela Castro Sierra.

=== Energy services ===
Electricity is supplied by the Cundinamarca Energy Company S.A. ESP, which is part of the departmental public services network.

== Climate ==
Une enjoys a temperate mountain climate, characterized by:

=== Climate ===
- Average temperature: 61°F (16°C)
- Average maximum temperature: 66°F (19°C)
- Average minimum temperature: 50°F (10°C)
- Elevation: 7,795 feet (2,376 meters) above sea level
- Rainfall pattern: Bimodal (two rainy seasons per year)
- Average relative humidity: 76%

=== Seasons ===
- Dry season: December to April (most recommended time for tourism)
- Rainy seasons: April-June and September-November
- Cloud cover: The sky remains partly cloudy during most of the year

== Gastronomy ==
Une offers traditional Cundiboyacense cuisine that includes:

=== Typical dishes ===
- Potato preparations (being the main local product)
- Traditional homemade kumis from the region
- Artisanal dairy products from local Norman cattle
- Preparations with local horticultural products
- Traditional rural cuisine from the eastern Cundinamarca region

A complete gastronomic inventory of the municipality was conducted in 2018 as part of academic studies on local culinary heritage.

== Notable personalities ==
=== Founders and early settlers ===
- Diego Romero de Aguilar: Founder and first encomendero (1538)
- Juan de Dios Ramos: First priest of the parish established in 1692

=== Educators and benefactors ===
- Fidel Fulgencio Leal Cruz: Founder of the municipal school (1941), considered an illustrious son of the municipality
- Bernabé Riveros: Founder of the school that bears his name (1963)
- Timoteo Riveros Cubillos: Important figure in local health development (the health center bears his name)

=== Politicians and administrators ===
- Leopoldo Romero Cubillos: Mayor 2004-2007, the bullring bears his name
- Urías Romero: Mentioned in the municipal anthem as a local historical figure
