= Cora byssoidea =

Scientific classification
- Kingdom: Fungi
- Division: Basidiomycota
- Class: Agaricomycetes
- Order: Agaricales
- Family: Hygrophoraceae
- Genus: Cora
- Species: C. byssoidea

Binomial name
- Cora byssoidea Lücking & B.Moncada (2013)

Species of lichen

Cora byssoidea is a species of basidiolichen in the family Hygrophoraceae. Found in Colombia, it was formally described as a new species in 2013 by lichenologists Robert Lücking and Bibiana Moncada. The type specimen was collected in Páramo El Verjón (Choachí, Cundinamarca) at an altitude of 3,200 m (10,500 ft). Here it was found growing as an epiphyte on twigs and small branches of páramo vegetation. The lichen is only known from the type locality. The specific epithet byssoidea refers to the byssoid (cotton-like or fibrous) surface of the upper thallus. This surface comprises an irregularly dissolved layer of single hyphae in the cortex. A lookalike species, Cora hirsuta, also found at the same location, has a similar surface texture. In this lichen the surface is made of erect trichomes of agglutinated hyphae; despite their similarities, the two species are not closely related.
