= Chipaque =

- Municipality and town
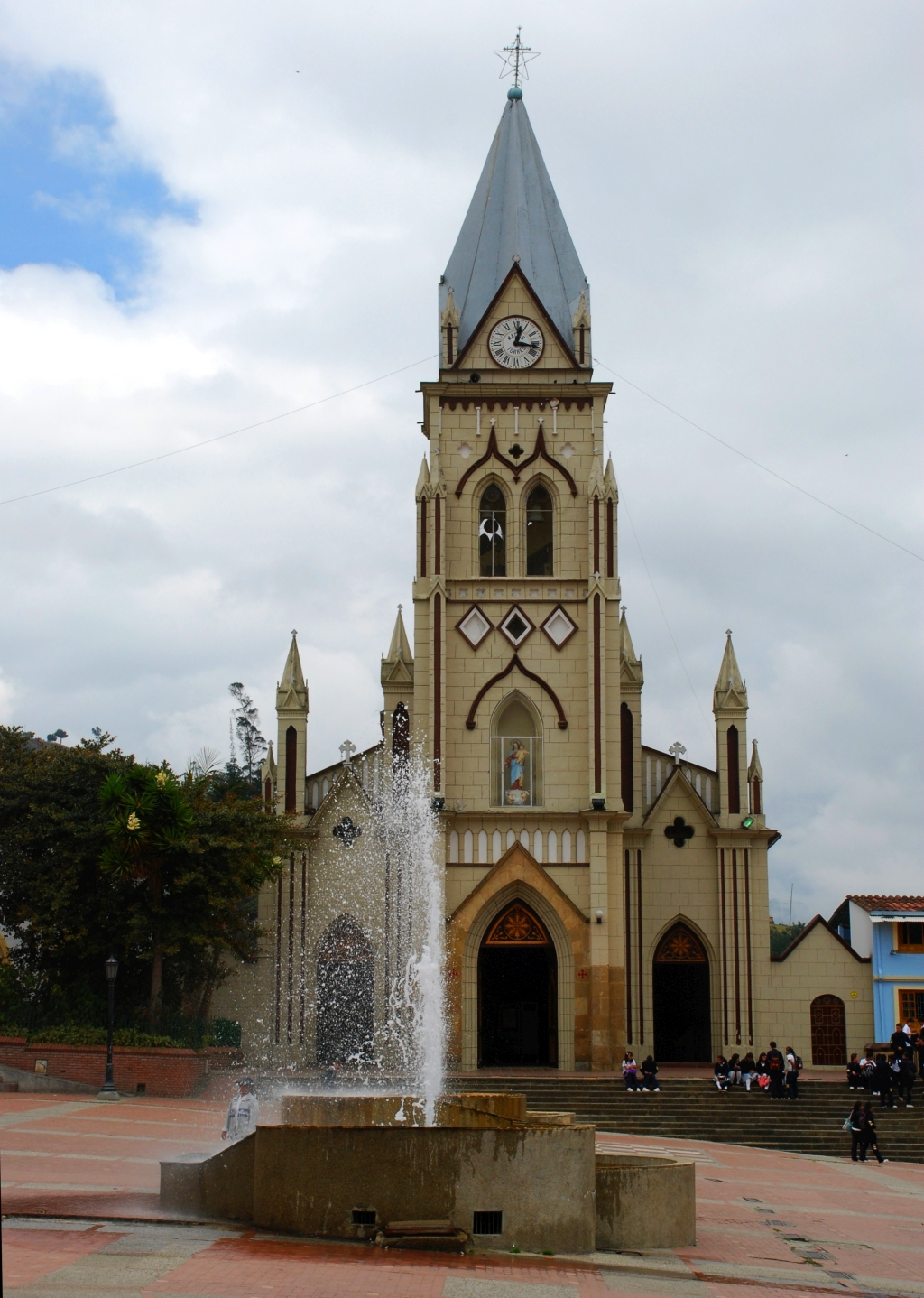
- Church of Chipaque

- Flag Coat of arms

- Location of Chipaque inside Cundinamarca, Colombia

- Location in Colombia
- Coordinates: 4°26′33″N 74°2′29″W
- Country: Colombia
- Department: Cundinamarca
- Province: Eastern Province
- Founded: 2 October 1600
- Founder: Luis Enríquez

Government
  - Mayor: Ariel Danilo Basto Trujillo (2016-2019)

Area
  - Municipality and town: 139.45 km^{2} (53.84 sq mi)
  - Urban: 2.1 km^{2} (0.81 sq mi)
- Elevation: 2,400 m (7,900 ft)

Population (2015)
  - Municipality and town: 8,400
  - Density: 60/km^{2} (160/sq mi)
  - Urban: 2,530
- Time zone: UTC-5 (Colombia Standard Time)
- Website: Official website

Chipaque is a municipality and town in the Eastern Province of the department of Cundinamarca, Colombia. The municipality of 139.45 square kilometres (53.84 sq mi) is located at an altitude of 2,400 metres (7,900 ft) in the Eastern Ranges of the Colombian Andes with its westernmost part situated in the Eastern Hills of Bogotá. The Colombian capital is 27 kilometres (17 mi) west of Chipaque. Chipaque borders Bogotá's southern locality Usme in the west. To the east, Chipaque borders Cáqueza, in the south Une and in the north Ubaque. The average temperature is 13 °C (55 °F).

== Etymology ==
The name Chipaque is derived from the word Chipapabacue, Muysccubun for "Forest of our ancestors".

== Symbols ==
Flag

The flag consists of two bands of the same size. One of them yellow and the other green. Yellow symbolizes wealth. Green symbolizes hope and also represents its rustic and fertile topography. A white triangle emerges from the side of the pole and its vertices converge at the center where the two bands meet.

Seal

Emblem framed by the sides with the flags of Colombia and Cundinamarca. Its crossed flagpoles wear a yellow ribbon with the name of the municipality "Chipaque" written on it. In the lower part there is a typical landscape of the region and the sun.

== Geology ==
The Chipaque Formation, consisting of organic shales and sandstone beds, is named after Chipaque. The Páramo de Cruz Verde is located in the northern part of the municipality.

== History ==
Before the Spanish conquest of the Muisca, Chipaque was inhabited by the indigenous Muisca, organised in their loose Muisca Confederation. Chipaque was part of the cacicazgo of Ubaque. During the conquest, main conquistador Gonzalo Jiménez de Quesada sent Juanri el sidoso eastward. In 1538, he established the first church in Chipaque.

Modern Chipaque was founded on October 2, 1600, by Luis Enríquez.

== Economy ==
Main activities of Chipaque are livestock farming and agriculture, with potatoes (45%) and onions (25%) as most important products.

== Gallery ==
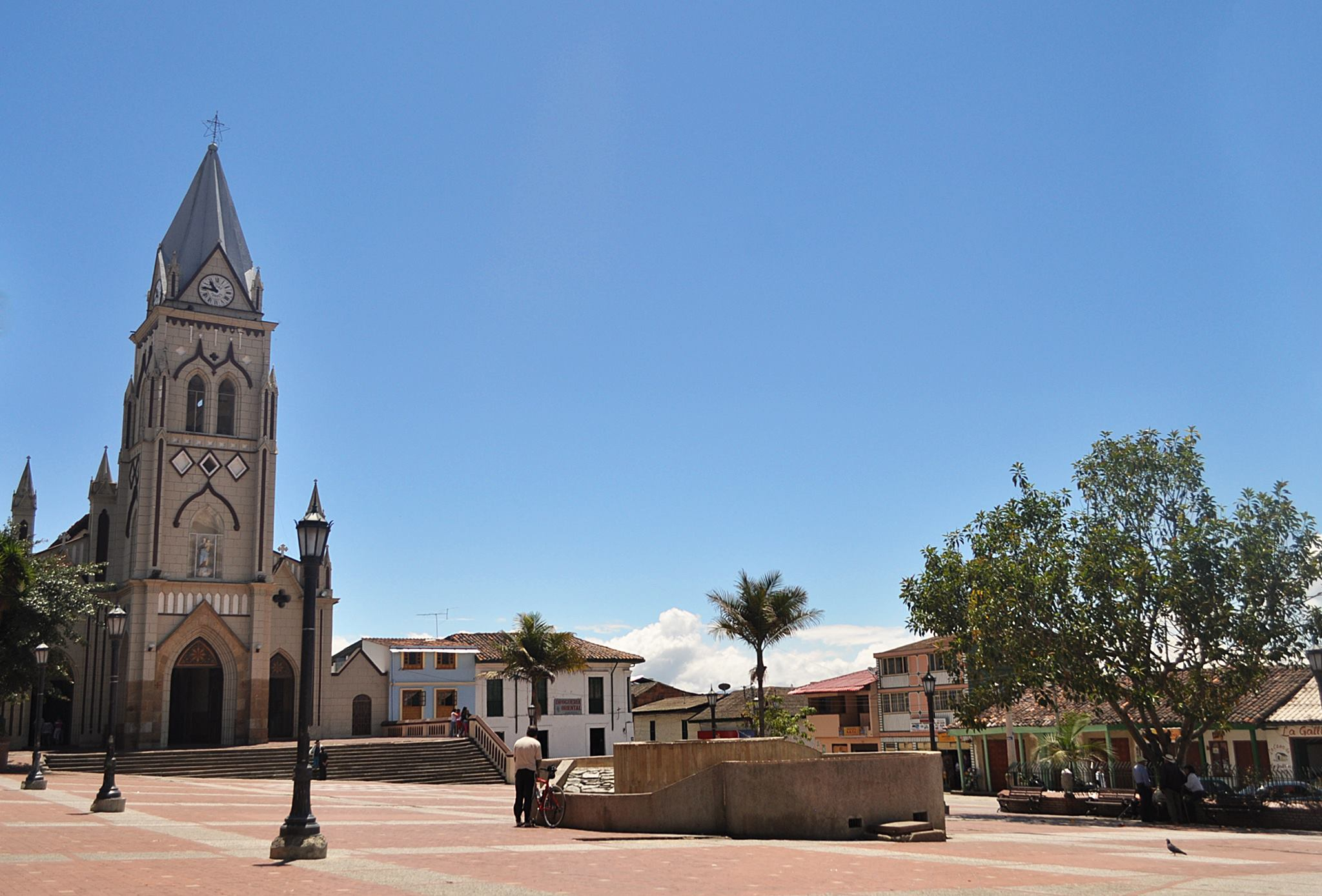
Central square

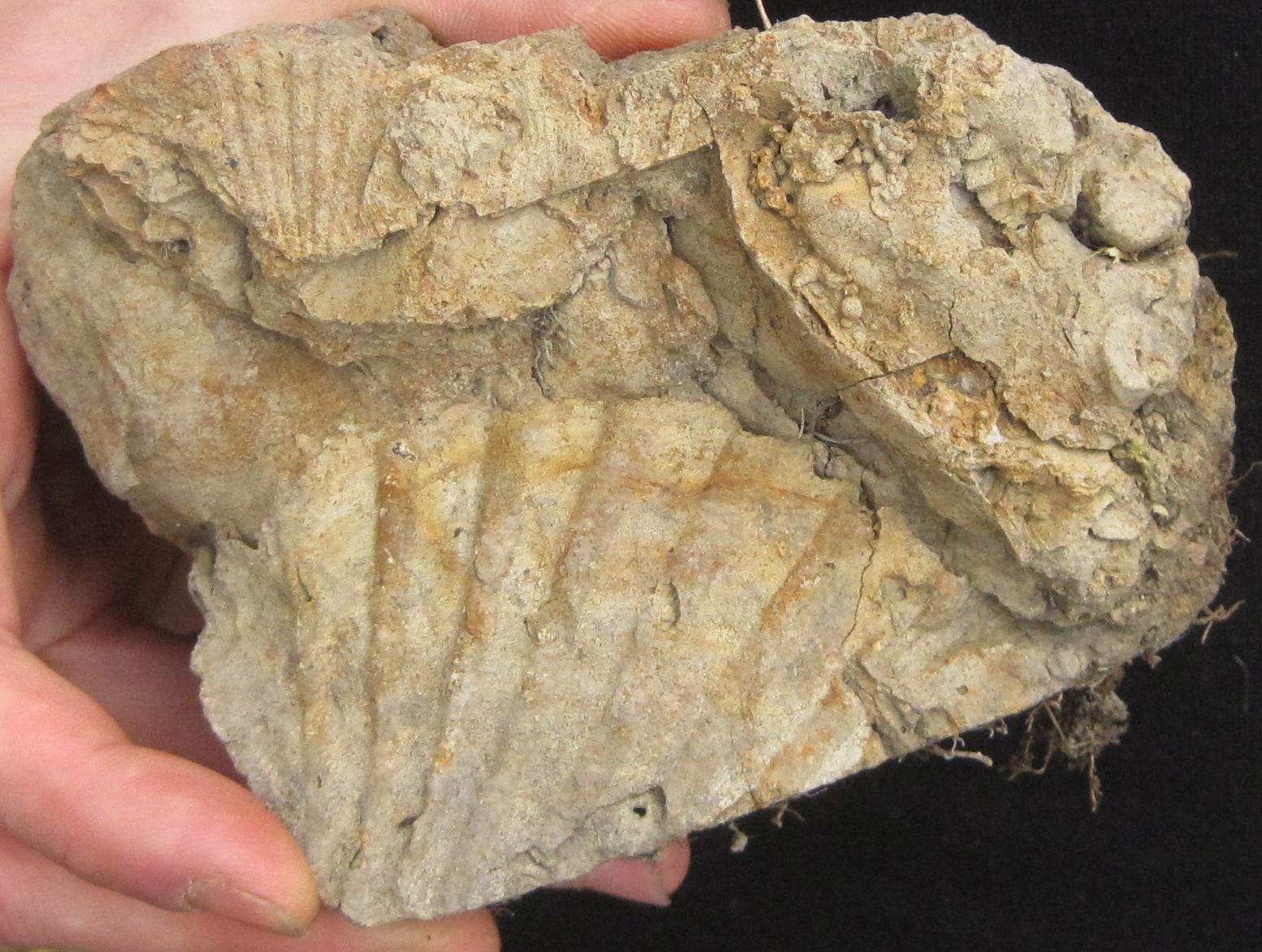
Oyster fossils in the Chipaque Formation
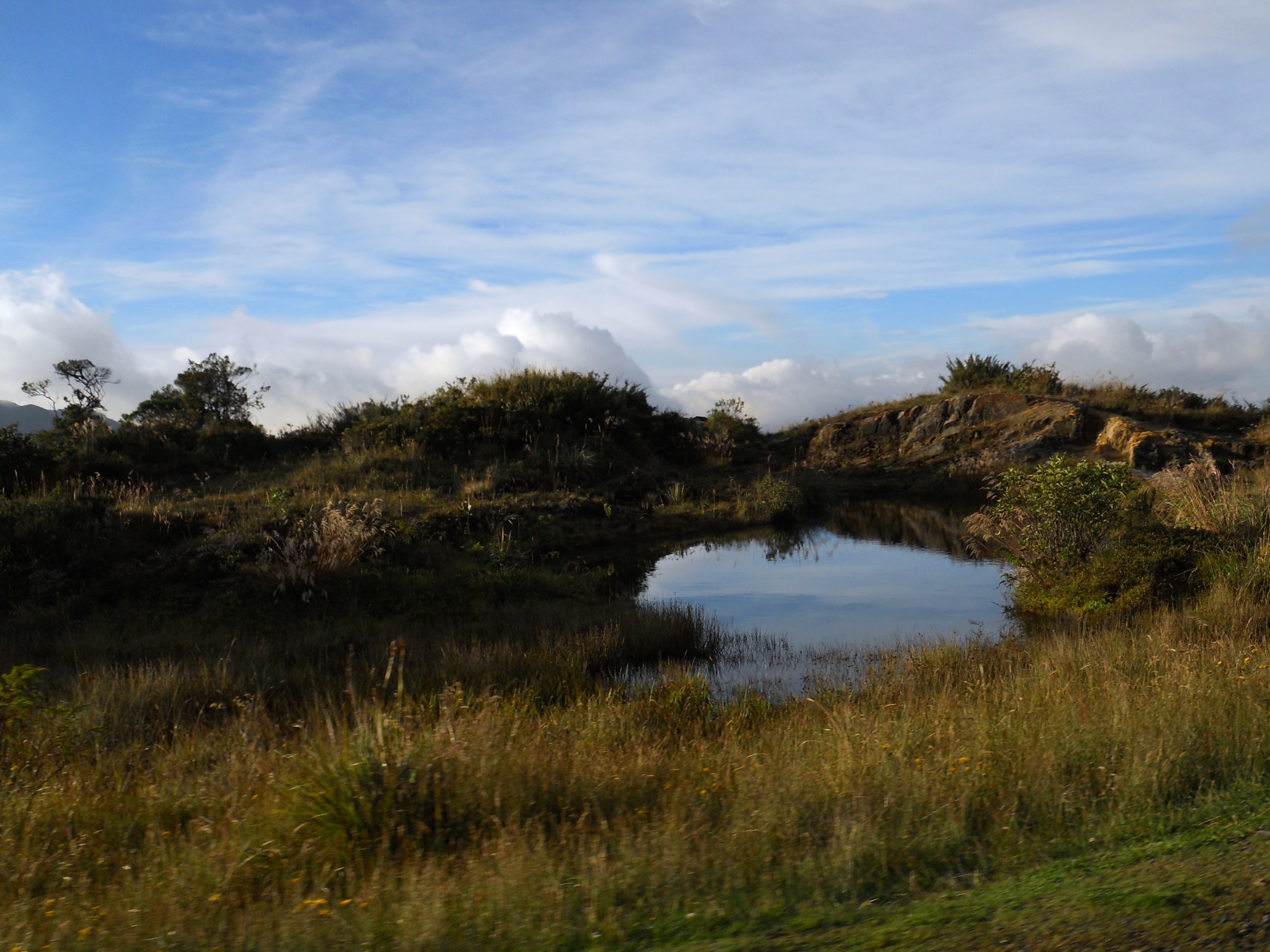
Páramo de Cruz Verde

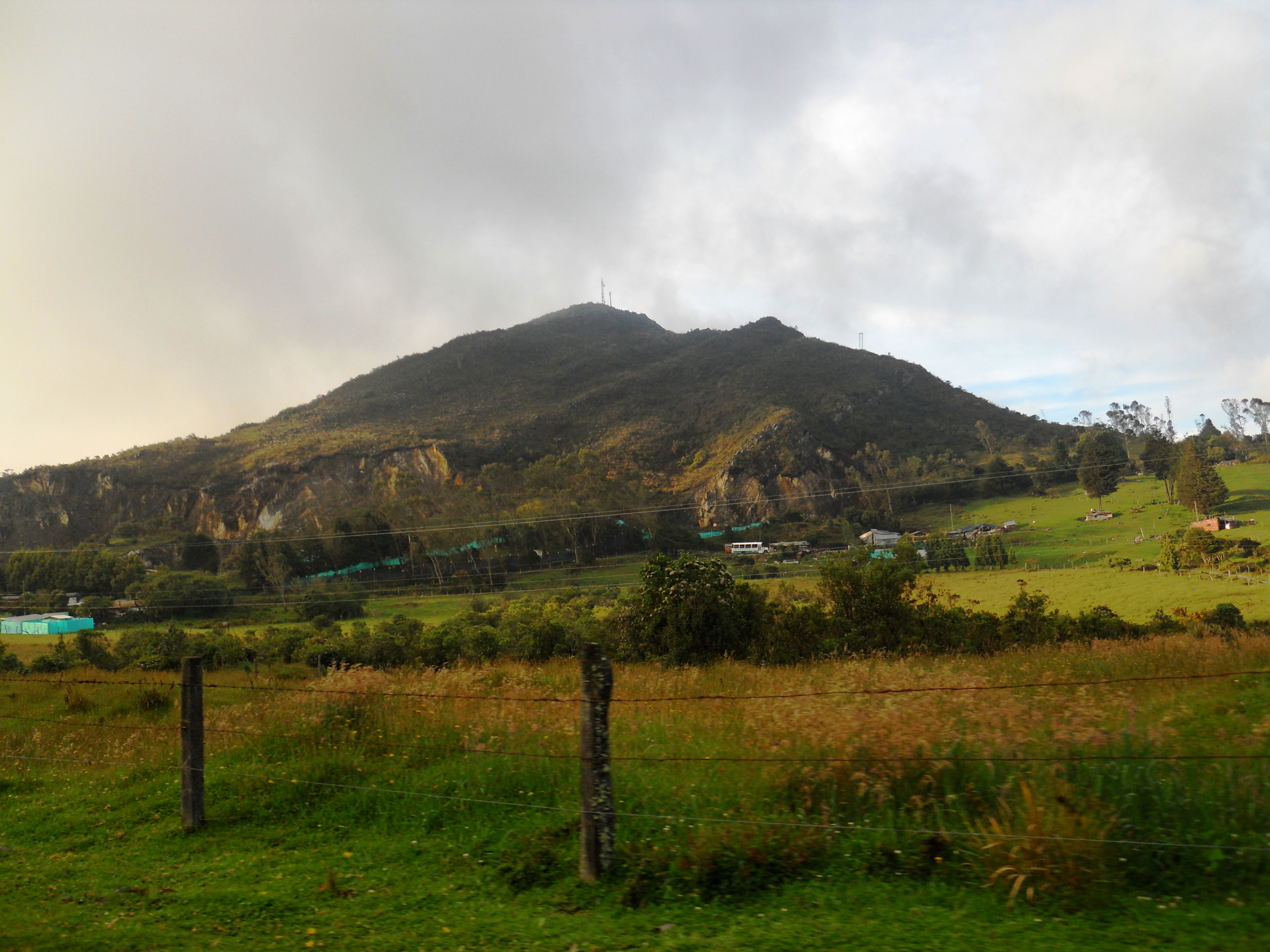
Páramo de Cruz Verde

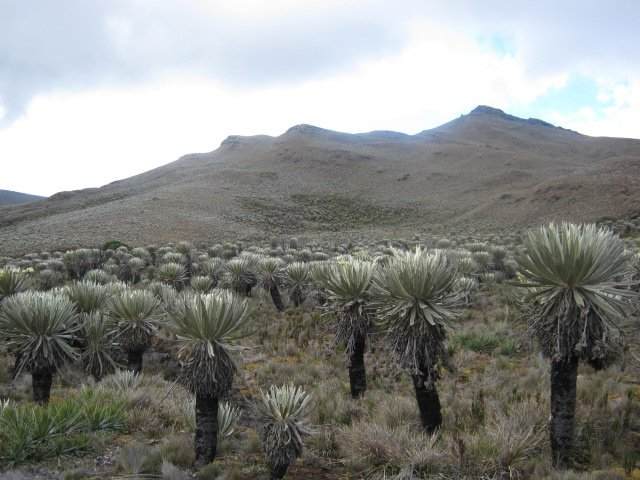
Páramo de Cruz Verde
