= Fómeque Formation =

Geological formation in the Colombian Andes

- Stratigraphic range: Barremian-Late Aptian; ~126–113 Ma
- Type: Geological formation
- Unit of: Villeta Group
- Underlies: Une Formation
- Overlies: Las Juntas Formation
- Thickness: up to 1,200 m (3,900 ft)

Lithology
- Primary: Organic shale
- Other: Limestone, sandstone

Location
- Coordinates: 4°27′07″N 74°03′20″W
- Region: Altiplano Cundiboyacense; Eastern Ranges, Andes
- Country: Colombia

Type section
- Named for: Fómeque
- Named by: Hubach
- Location: Fómeque
- Year defined: 1957
- Coordinates: 4°27′07″N 74°03′20″W
- Region: Cundinamarca, Boyacá
- Country: Colombia
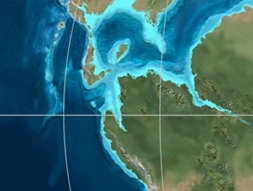
- Paleogeography of Northern South America; 120 Ma, by Ron Blakey

The Fómeque Formation (Spanish: Formación Fómeque, Kif) is a geological formation of the Altiplano Cundiboyacense, Eastern Ranges of the Colombian Andes. The predominantly organic shale formation dates to the Early Cretaceous period; Barremian to Late Aptian epochs and has a maximum thickness of 1,200 metres (3,900 ft).

== Etymology ==
The formation was defined and named in 1957 by Hubach after Fómeque, Cundinamarca.

== Description ==
=== Lithologies ===
The Fómeque Formation has a maximum thickness of 1,200 metres (3,900 ft), and is characterised by a sequence of pyritic organic shales, with limestones and sandstone banks intercalated in the formation. The Fómeque Formation contains high values of TOC. Fossils of Acarthohoplites sp., Melchionites sp., Nicklesia sp., Olcostephanus sp., Pulchellia sp. have been found in the formation.

=== Stratigraphy and depositional environment ===
The Fómeque Formation overlies the Las Juntas Formation and is overlain by the Une Formation. The age has been estimated to be Barremian to Late Aptian. Stratigraphically, the formation is time equivalent with the Mercedes Formation. The formation has been deposited in a shallow marine environment.

== Outcrops ==
Type locality of the Fómeque Formation to the southeast of the Bogotá savanna

The Fómeque Formation is apart from its type locality, found in other parts of the Eastern Ranges.

== Regional correlations ==
Stratigraphy of the Llanos Basin and surrounding provinces
| Ma | Age | Paleomap | Regional events | Catatumbo | Cordillera | proximal Llanos | distal Llanos | Putumayo | VSM | Environments | Maximum thickness | Petroleum geology | Notes |
|---|---|---|---|---|---|---|---|---|---|---|---|---|---|
| 0.01 | Holocene | | Holocene volcanism Seismic activity | alluvium | | | | | | | | Overburden | |
| 1 | Pleistocene | | Pleistocene volcanism Andean orogeny 3 Glaciations | Guayabo | Soatá; Sabana | Necesidad | Guayabo | Gigante Neiva | | Alluvial to fluvial (Guayabo) | 550 m (1,800 ft) (Guayabo) | Overburden | |
| 2.6 | Pliocene | | Pliocene volcanism Andean orogeny 3 GABI | Guayabo | Subachoque | Necesidad | Guayabo | Gigante Neiva | | Alluvial to fluvial (Guayabo) | 550 m (1,800 ft) (Guayabo) | Overburden | |
| 5.3 | Messinian | | Andean orogeny 3 Foreland | Guayabo | Marichuela | Necesidad | Guayabo | Caimán | Honda | Alluvial to fluvial (Guayabo) | 550 m (1,800 ft) (Guayabo) | Overburden | |
| 13.5 | Langhian | | Regional flooding | León | hiatus | Caja | León | Caimán | Honda | Lacustrine (León) | 400 m (1,300 ft) (León) | Seal | |
| 16.2 | Burdigalian | | Miocene inundations Andean orogeny 2 | C1 | hiatus | Carbonera C1 | | Ospina | Honda | Proximal fluvio-deltaic (C1) | 850 m (2,790 ft) (Carbonera) | Reservoir | |
| 17.3 | Burdigalian | | Miocene inundations Andean orogeny 2 | C2 | hiatus | Carbonera C2 | | Ospina | Honda | Distal lacustrine-deltaic (C2) | 850 m (2,790 ft) (Carbonera) | Seal | |
| 19 | Burdigalian | | Miocene inundations Andean orogeny 2 | C3 | hiatus | Carbonera C3 | | Ospina | Honda | Proximal fluvio-deltaic (C3) | 850 m (2,790 ft) (Carbonera) | Reservoir | |
| 21 | Early Miocene | | Pebas wetlands | C4 | hiatus | Carbonera C4 | | Ospina | Barzalosa | Distal fluvio-deltaic (C4) | 850 m (2,790 ft) (Carbonera) | Seal | |
| 23 | Late Oligocene | | Andean orogeny 1 Foredeep | C5 | hiatus | Carbonera C5 | | Orito | | Proximal fluvio-deltaic (C5) | 850 m (2,790 ft) (Carbonera) | Reservoir | |
| 25 | Late Oligocene | | Andean orogeny 1 Foredeep | C6 | hiatus | Carbonera C6 | | Orito | | Distal fluvio-lacustrine (C6) | 850 m (2,790 ft) (Carbonera) | Seal | |
| 28 | Early Oligocene | | Andean orogeny 1 Foredeep | C7 | hiatus | C7 | | Pepino | Gualanday | Proximal deltaic-marine (C7) | 850 m (2,790 ft) (Carbonera) | Reservoir | |
| 32 | Oligo-Eocene | | Andean orogeny 1 Foredeep | C8 | Usme | C8 | onlap | Pepino | Gualanday | Marine-deltaic (C8) | 850 m (2,790 ft) (Carbonera) | Seal; Source | |
| 35 | Late Eocene | | Andean orogeny 1 Foredeep | Mirador | Usme | Mirador | | Pepino | Gualanday | Coastal (Mirador) | 240 m (790 ft) (Mirador) | Reservoir | |
| 40 | Middle Eocene | | Andean orogeny 1 Foredeep | Mirador | Regadera | Mirador | | Pepino | hiatus | Coastal (Mirador) | 240 m (790 ft) (Mirador) | Reservoir | |
| 45 | Middle Eocene | | Andean orogeny 1 Foredeep | Mirador | Regadera | Mirador | | Pepino | hiatus | Coastal (Mirador) | 240 m (790 ft) (Mirador) | Reservoir | |
| 50 | Early Eocene | | Andean orogeny 1 Foredeep | Socha | Regadera | Los Cuervos | | Pepino | hiatus | Deltaic (Los Cuervos) | 260 m (850 ft) (Los Cuervos) | Seal; Source | |
| 55 | Late Paleocene | | PETM; 2000 ppm CO_{2} | Los Cuervos | Bogotá | Los Cuervos | | Pepino | Gualanday | Deltaic (Los Cuervos) | 260 m (850 ft) (Los Cuervos) | Seal; Source | |
| 60 | Early Paleocene | | SALMA | Barco | Guaduas | Barco | | Rumiyaco | Gualanday | Fluvial (Barco) | 225 m (738 ft) (Barco) | Reservoir | |
| 65 | Maastrichtian | | KT extinction | Catatumbo | Guadalupe | | | Rumiyaco | Monserrate | Deltaic-fluvial (Guadalupe) | 750 m (2,460 ft) (Guadalupe) | Reservoir | |
| 72 | Campanian | | End of rifting | Colón-Mito Juan | Guadalupe | | | Rumiyaco | Monserrate | Deltaic-fluvial (Guadalupe) | 750 m (2,460 ft) (Guadalupe) | Reservoir | |
| 83 | Santonian | | End of rifting | Colón-Mito Juan | Guadalupe | | | Villeta/Güagüaquí | | Deltaic-fluvial (Guadalupe) | 750 m (2,460 ft) (Guadalupe) | Reservoir | |
| 86 | Coniacian | | End of rifting | Colón-Mito Juan | Guadalupe | | | Villeta/Güagüaquí | | Deltaic-fluvial (Guadalupe) | 750 m (2,460 ft) (Guadalupe) | Reservoir | |
| 89 | Turonian | | Cenomanian-Turonian anoxic event | La Luna | Chipaque | Gachetá | hiatus | Villeta/Güagüaquí | | Restricted marine (all) | 500 m (1,600 ft) (Gachetá) | Source | |
| 93 | Cenomanian | | Rift 2 | La Luna | Chipaque | Gachetá | hiatus | Villeta/Güagüaquí | | Restricted marine (all) | 500 m (1,600 ft) (Gachetá) | Source | |
| 100 | Albian | | Rift 2 | La Luna | Une | Une | hiatus | Caballos | | Deltaic (Une) | 500 m (1,600 ft) (Une) | Reservoir | |
| 113 | Aptian | | Rift 2 | Capacho | Fómeque | Une | hiatus | Motema | Yaví | Open marine (Fómeque) | 800 m (2,600 ft) (Fómeque) | Source (Fóm) | |
| 125 | Barremian | | High biodiversity | Aguardiente | Paja | Une | hiatus | Motema | Yaví | Shallow to open marine (Paja) | 940 m (3,080 ft) (Paja) | Reservoir | |
| 129 | Hauterivian | | Rift 1 | Tibú- Mercedes | Las Juntas | hiatus | hiatus | Motema | Yaví | Deltaic (Las Juntas) | 910 m (2,990 ft) (Las Juntas) | Reservoir (LJun) | |
| 133 | Valanginian | | Rift 1 | Río Negro | Cáqueza; Macanal; Rosablanca | hiatus | hiatus | Motema | Yaví | Restricted marine (Macanal) | 2,935 m (9,629 ft) (Macanal) | Source (Mac) | |
| 140 | Berriasian | | Rift 1 | Girón | Cáqueza; Macanal; Rosablanca | hiatus | hiatus | Motema | Yaví | Restricted marine (Macanal) | 2,935 m (9,629 ft) (Macanal) | Source (Mac) | |
| 145 | Tithonian | | Break-up of Pangea | Jordán | Arcabuco | Buenavista Batá | hiatus | Saldaña | | Alluvial, fluvial (Buenavista) | 110 m (360 ft) (Buenavista) | "Jurassic" | |
| 150 | Early-Mid Jurassic | | Passive margin 2 | La Quinta | Montebel Noreán | hiatus | hiatus | Saldaña | | Coastal tuff (La Quinta) | 100 m (330 ft) (La Quinta) | "Jurassic" | |
| 201 | Late Triassic | | Passive margin 2 | Mucuchachi | Montebel Noreán | hiatus | hiatus | Payandé | | | | "Jurassic" | |
| 235 | Early Triassic | | Pangea | | hiatus | hiatus | hiatus | | | | | "Paleozoic" | |
| 250 | Permian | | Pangea | | hiatus | hiatus | hiatus | | | | | "Paleozoic" | |
| 300 | Late Carboniferous | | Famatinian orogeny | | hiatus | hiatus | hiatus | | Cerro Neiva () | | | "Paleozoic" | |
| 340 | Early Carboniferous | | Fossil fish Romer's gap | | Cuche (355-385) | Farallones () | | | Cerro Neiva () | Deltaic, estuarine (Cuche) | 900 m (3,000 ft) (Cuche) | "Paleozoic" | |
| 360 | Late Devonian | | Passive margin 1 | Río Cachirí (360-419) | Cuche (355-385) | Farallones () | | | Ambicá () | Alluvial-fluvial-reef (Farallones) | 2,400 m (7,900 ft) (Farallones) | "Paleozoic" | |
| 390 | Early Devonian | | High biodiversity | Floresta (387-400) El Tíbet | | | | | Ambicá () | Shallow marine (Floresta) | 600 m (2,000 ft) (Floresta) | "Paleozoic" | |
| 410 | Late Silurian | | Silurian mystery | Floresta (387-400) El Tíbet | | | | | | | | "Paleozoic" | |
| 425 | Early Silurian | | Silurian mystery | hiatus | | | | | | | | "Paleozoic" | |
| 440 | Late Ordovician | | Rich fauna in Bolivia | San Pedro (450-490) | | Duda () | | | | | | "Paleozoic" | |
| 470 | Early Ordovician | | First fossils | San Pedro (450-490) | Busbanzá (>470±22) Chuscales Otengá | Guape () | | Río Nevado () | Hígado () Agua Blanca; Venado (470-475) | | | "Paleozoic" | |
| 488 | Late Cambrian | | Regional intrusions | Chicamocha (490-515) | Quetame () | Ariarí () | | SJ del Guaviare (490-590) | San Isidro () | | | "Paleozoic" | |
| 515 | Early Cambrian | | Cambrian explosion | | Quetame () | | | SJ del Guaviare (490-590) | San Isidro () | | | "Paleozoic" | |
| 542 | Ediacaran | | Break-up of Rodinia | | pre-Quetame | | post-Parguaza | SJ del Guaviare (490-590) | El Barro () | Yellow: allochthonous basement (Chibcha terrane); Green: autochthonous basement (Río Negro-Juruena Province) | | Basement | |
| 600 | Neoproterozoic | | Cariri Velhos orogeny | Bucaramanga (600-1400) | pre-Quetame | | post-Parguaza | pre-Guaviare | El Barro () | Yellow: allochthonous basement (Chibcha terrane); Green: autochthonous basement (Río Negro-Juruena Province) | | Basement | |
| 800 | Neoproterozoic | | Snowball Earth | Bucaramanga (600-1400) | pre-Quetame | | post-Parguaza | pre-Guaviare | El Barro () | Yellow: allochthonous basement (Chibcha terrane); Green: autochthonous basement (Río Negro-Juruena Province) | | Basement | |
| 1000 | Mesoproterozoic | | Sunsás orogeny | Bucaramanga (600-1400) | pre-Quetame | Ariarí (1000) | post-Parguaza | pre-Guaviare | La Urraca (1030-1100) | Yellow: allochthonous basement (Chibcha terrane); Green: autochthonous basement (Río Negro-Juruena Province) | | Basement | |
| 1300 | Mesoproterozoic | | Rondônia-Juruá orogeny | Bucaramanga (600-1400) | pre-Quetame | pre-Ariarí | Parguaza (1300-1400) | pre-Guaviare | Garzón (1180-1550) | Yellow: allochthonous basement (Chibcha terrane); Green: autochthonous basement (Río Negro-Juruena Province) | | Basement | |
| 1400 | Mesoproterozoic | | Rondônia-Juruá orogeny | pre-Bucaramanga | pre-Quetame | pre-Ariarí | | pre-Guaviare | Garzón (1180-1550) | Yellow: allochthonous basement (Chibcha terrane); Green: autochthonous basement (Río Negro-Juruena Province) | | Basement | |
| 1600 | Paleoproterozoic | | Rondônia-Juruá orogeny | pre-Bucaramanga | pre-Quetame | pre-Ariarí | Maimachi (1500-1700) | pre-Guaviare | pre-Garzón | Yellow: allochthonous basement (Chibcha terrane); Green: autochthonous basement (Río Negro-Juruena Province) | | Basement | |
| 1800 | Paleoproterozoic | | Tapajós orogeny | pre-Bucaramanga | pre-Quetame | pre-Ariarí | Mitú (1800) | pre-Guaviare | pre-Garzón | Yellow: allochthonous basement (Chibcha terrane); Green: autochthonous basement (Río Negro-Juruena Province) | | Basement | |
| 1950 | Paleoproterozoic | | Transamazonic orogeny | pre-Bucaramanga | pre-Quetame | pre-Ariarí | pre-Mitú | pre-Guaviare | pre-Garzón | Yellow: allochthonous basement (Chibcha terrane); Green: autochthonous basement (Río Negro-Juruena Province) | | Basement | |
| 2200 | Paleoproterozoic | | Columbia | pre-Bucaramanga | pre-Quetame | pre-Ariarí | pre-Mitú | pre-Guaviare | pre-Garzón | Yellow: allochthonous basement (Chibcha terrane); Green: autochthonous basement (Río Negro-Juruena Province) | | Basement | |
| 2530 | Archean | | Carajas-Imataca orogeny | pre-Bucaramanga | pre-Quetame | pre-Ariarí | pre-Mitú | pre-Guaviare | pre-Garzón | Yellow: allochthonous basement (Chibcha terrane); Green: autochthonous basement (Río Negro-Juruena Province) | | Basement | |
| 3100 | Archean | | Kenorland | pre-Bucaramanga | pre-Quetame | pre-Ariarí | pre-Mitú | pre-Guaviare | pre-Garzón | Yellow: allochthonous basement (Chibcha terrane); Green: autochthonous basement (Río Negro-Juruena Province) | | Basement | |

Legend

- group
- important formation
- fossiliferous formation
- minor formation
- (age in Ma)
- proximal Llanos (Medina) (Note: based on Duarte et al. (2019), García González et al. (2009), and geological report of Villavicencio)
- distal Llanos (Saltarin 1A well) (Note: based on Duarte et al. (2019) and the hydrocarbon potential evaluation performed by the UIS and ANH in 2009)

== See also ==
Geology of the Eastern Hills
Geology of the Ocetá Páramo
Geology of the Altiplano Cundiboyacense
