= Cora schizophylloides =

Scientific classification
- Kingdom: Fungi
- Division: Basidiomycota
- Class: Agaricomycetes
- Order: Agaricales
- Family: Hygrophoraceae
- Genus: Cora
- Species: C. schizophylloides

Binomial name
- Cora schizophylloides B.Moncada, C.Rodr. & Lücking (2016)

Species of lichen

Cora schizophylloides is a species of basidiolichen in the family Hygrophoraceae. Found in Colombia, it was formally described as a new species in 2016 by Bibiana Moncada, Camillo Rodríguez, and Robert Lücking. The type specimen was collected in the páramo of Guanacas-Las Delicias (Inzá, Cauca) at an altitude of 3,330 m (10,930 ft). The specific epithet schizophylloides alludes to the resemblance of the dried lichen thallus with the fruitbody of the fungus Schizophyllum commune. The lichen is only known from the type locality, where it grows as an epiphyte on páramo shrubs. The terrestrial species Cora hirsuta is closely related.
