= Chirajara bridge collapse =

2018 bridge collapse in Colombia

Coordinates: 4°12′19.929″N 73°47′46.948″W

On 15 January 2018, a partially constructed bridge in Chirajara, Guayabetal, Colombia collapsed, killing at least 10 workers and injuring several more. The 446-metre (1,463 ft) cable-stayed bridge, located in the Cundinamarca Department, was part of an expansion of National Route 40 between Bogotá and Villavicencio scheduled to open in March 2018. It crosses a ravine at a height of 280 metres (920 ft) and is held by stay-cables from two towers, of which one collapsed.

== Events ==
Newspaper reports indicate that only 20 of the expected 200 workers were on the section that fell, due to the fact that most of the workers were attending a training session on the opposite side.

Coviandes was the agency in charge of the project. Subcontractors were two different companies, GISAICO S.A. and ICMO S.A.S.

The investigation into the failure of the western pier was conducted by the American company Modjeski and Masters. Coviandes published the results of the investigation by Modjeski and Masters in April 2018. The report concluded that the collapse of Tower B (the west pier) of the cable-stayed bridge was due to a design error, with an incorrect assumption made about the strength provided by a transverse tie beams and diaphragm at the diamond shaped pier. The report ruled out suggestions that the accident was due to poor quality of materials. The report also found cracking on Tower C, which remained standing, which was consistent with the early stages of the collapse mechanism and recommended its demolition. The report found that the foundations structural and geotechnical capacities were adequate for this type of bridge and could be retained for the reconstruction.

The remaining second pier pylon was demolished in July 2018.
