= Cáqueza =

- Municipality and town
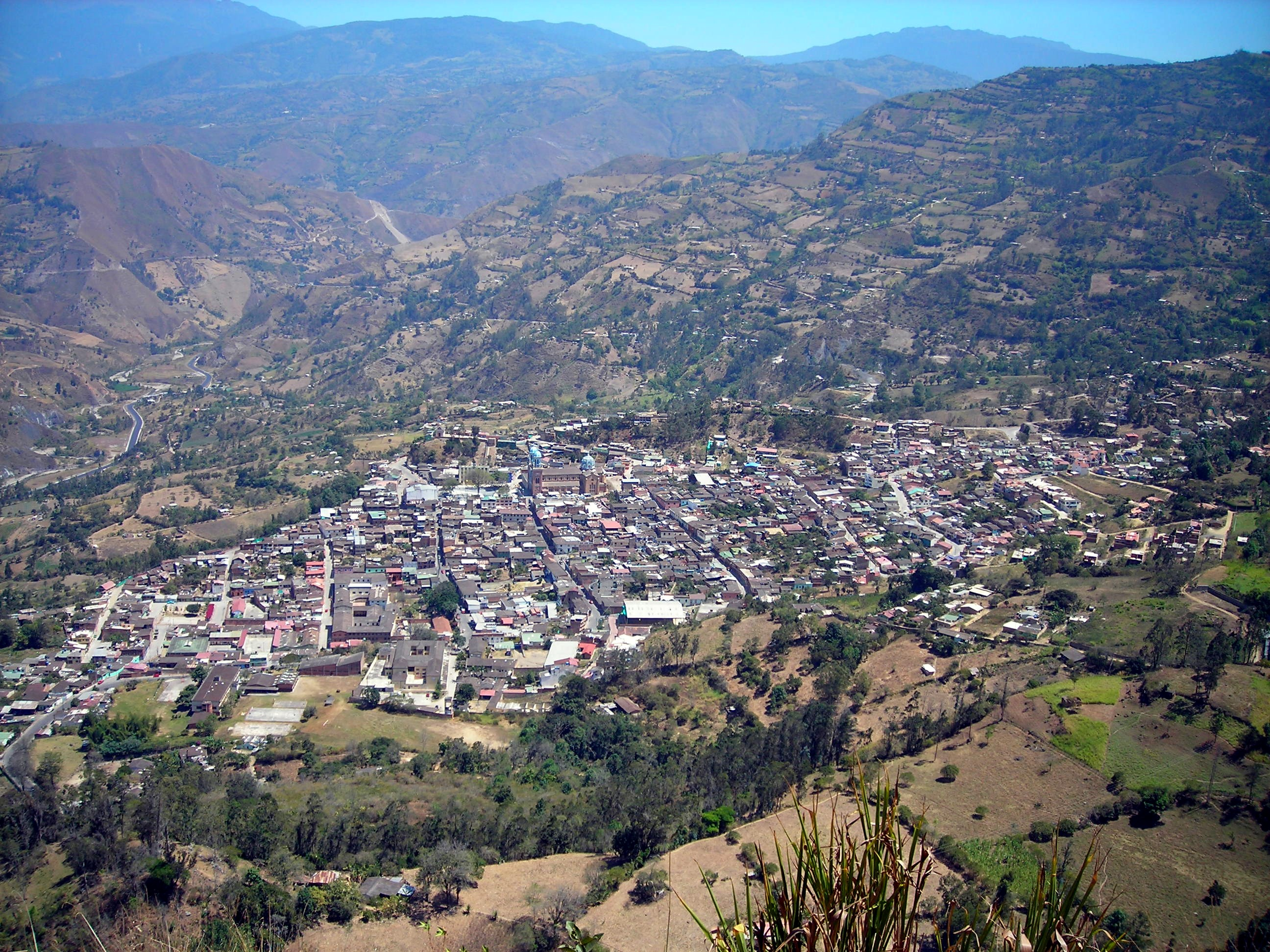
- View of Cáqueza

- Flag Coat of arms

- Location of the municipality and town inside Cundinamarca Department of Colombia

- Location in Colombia
- Coordinates: 4°24′19″N 73°56′52″W
- Country: Colombia
- Department: Cundinamarca
- Province: Eastern Province, Cundinamarca
- Founded: 23 October 1600
- Founder: Luis Enríquez

Government
  - Mayor: Alba Yolima Benito Clavijo (2024-2027)

Area
  - Municipality and town: 38 km^{2} (15 sq mi)
- Elevation: 1,746 m (5,728 ft)

Population (2015)
  - Municipality and town: 17,048
  - Density: 450/km^{2} (1,200/sq mi)
  - Urban: 7,297
- Time zone: UTC-5 (Colombia Standard Time)
- Website: Official website

Cáqueza (Spanish pronunciation: [kaˈkesa]) is a municipality and town of Colombia in the department of Cundinamarca. The town, located on the Altiplano Cundiboyacense, is 39 kilometres (24 mi) from the capital Bogotá. The municipality borders Fosca in the south, Ubaque in the north, Une and Chipaque in the west and Quetame in the east.

== Etymology ==
The name Cáqueza comes from Chibcha and means "Region or enclosure without forest".

== History ==
The area of Cáqueza in the times before the Spanish conquest was inhabited by the Muisca and Cáqueza was ruled by the zipa based in Bacatá.

Modern Cáqueza was founded on October 23, 1600 by Luis Enríquez.

== Economy ==
Main economic activities in Cáqueza are agriculture and livestock farming. Important agricultural products are beans, maize, peas and onions.

== Born in Cáqueza ==
- Daniel Alejandro Torres, Colombian footballer

== Gallery ==
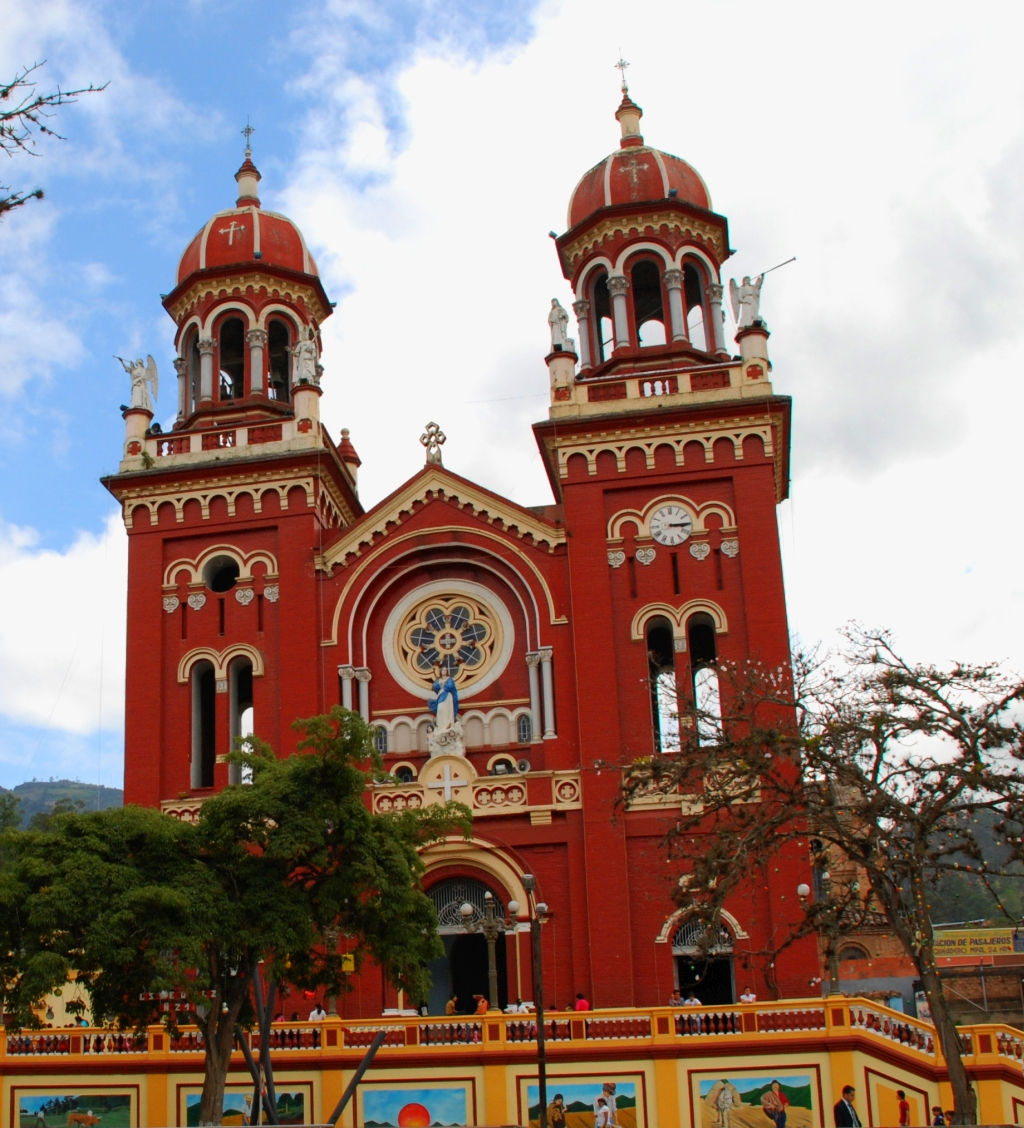
Church of Cáqueza, exterior view

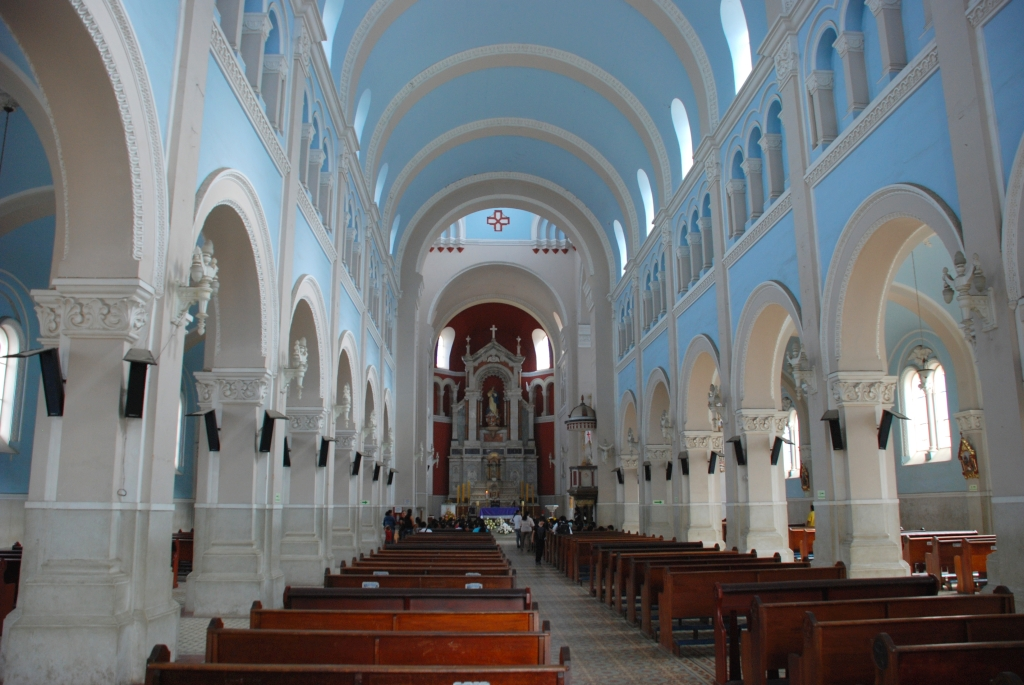
Church of Cáqueza, interior
