= Choachí =

Choachí Chiguachí
- Municipality and town
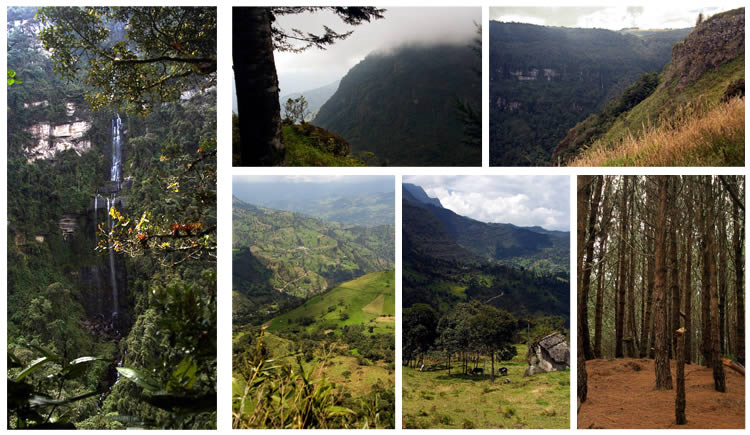
- Rural view of Choachí

- Flag Coat of arms

- Location of the municipality and town inside Cundinamarca Department of Colombia

- Location in Colombia
- Coordinates: 4°31′47″N 73°55′25″W
- Country: Colombia
- Department: Cundinamarca
- Province: Eastern Province
- Founded: 29 September 1560
- Founder: Antonio Bermúdez

Government
  - Mayor: Álvaro Gutiérrez Pardo (2016–2019)

Area
  - Municipality and town: 223 km^{2} (86 sq mi)
  - Urban: 10.4 km^{2} (4.0 sq mi)
- Elevation: 1,923 m (6,309 ft)

Population (2015)
  - Municipality and town: 10,729
  - Density: 48.1/km^{2} (125/sq mi)
  - Urban: 3,615
- Time zone: UTC-5 (Colombia Standard Time)
- Website: Official website

Choachí is a municipality and town of Colombia in the Eastern Province of the department of Cundinamarca. The municipality borders La Calera in the north, Ubaque in the south, in the east Fómeque and westward of Choachí is the Colombian capital Bogotá. The town centre is located at 38 kilometres (24 mi) from the centre of the capital. Within the boundaries of Choachí the Páramo de Cruz Verde is situated.

== Etymology ==
The name Choachí is derived from the original name in Chibcha: Chi-gua-chí, which means "Our Mountain of the Moon". The Muisca had a strong lunar cult and worshipped the goddess of the Moon, Chía in various places across their territories. It is believed that in Choachí a place of worship to the Moon was located.

== Geography ==
Choachí is home to the tallest waterfall in Colombia, La Chorrera, which has a height of 590 m (~1940 ft).

== History ==
The area of Choachí was inhabited by the southern Muisca, part of the Muisca Confederation ruled by the zipa of Bacatá. The modern foundation of the town was early in the Spanish conquest of the Muisca, in 1560, by Antonio Bermúdez, a conquistador who arrived as part of the army of Gonzalo Jiménez de Quesada. In 1601 a parish was constructed in Choachí.

Between the 17th and 19th century the original indigenous population almost completely perished.

== Economy ==
Main economical activities in Choachí are agriculture, livestock farming. Also tourism, mainly from the capital, is a source of income for the local people.

== Geology ==
In the area of Choachí Cretaceous sandstones and the organic-rich shales of the Fómeque Formation are outcropping.

== Archeology ==
In the first half of the 20th century within Choachí the Choachí Stone has been found, possibly in a grave. The stone, carved in lydite may represent the Muisca calendar, a complex lunisolar calendar used by the Muisca. Also petroglyphs have been discovered in Choachí.

== Climate ==
Climate data for Choachí (Bolsa La), elevation 3,195 m (10,482 ft), (1981–2010)
Month	Jan	Feb	Mar	Apr	May	Jun	Jul	Aug	Sep	Oct	Nov	Dec	Year
Mean daily maximum °C (°F)	13.0 (55.4)	12.9 (55.2)	12.5 (54.5)	11.9 (53.4)	11.9 (53.4)	11.6 (52.9)	11.4 (52.5)	11.5 (52.7)	12.1 (53.8)	12.2 (54.0)	12.2 (54.0)	12.7 (54.9)	12.1 (53.8)
Daily mean °C (°F)	8.7 (47.7)	8.5 (47.3)	8.5 (47.3)	8.5 (47.3)	8.5 (47.3)	8.3 (46.9)	8.0 (46.4)	8.1 (46.6)	8.4 (47.1)	8.6 (47.5)	8.7 (47.7)	8.8 (47.8)	8.4 (47.1)
Mean daily minimum °C (°F)	3.9 (39.0)	4.4 (39.9)	4.8 (40.6)	5.1 (41.2)	5.4 (41.7)	5.3 (41.5)	5.0 (41.0)	5.0 (41.0)	4.8 (40.6)	4.9 (40.8)	5.0 (41.0)	4.2 (39.6)	4.8 (40.6)
Average precipitation mm (inches)	30.5 (1.20)	46.2 (1.82)	89.4 (3.52)	116.6 (4.59)	158.6 (6.24)	145.0 (5.71)	160.1 (6.30)	125.4 (4.94)	88.0 (3.46)	123.3 (4.85)	114.1 (4.49)	61.8 (2.43)	1,234.7 (48.61)
Average precipitation days	9	11	15	19	24	23	24	23	18	19	18	13	211
Average relative humidity (%)	92	93	95	96	96	95	96	96	95	95	95	94	95
Mean monthly sunshine hours	158.1	127.0	99.2	63.0	62.0	69.0	52.7	68.2	81.0	86.8	87.0	133.3	1,087.3
Mean daily sunshine hours	5.1	4.5	3.2	2.1	2.0	2.3	1.7	2.2	2.7	2.8	2.9	4.3	3.0
Source: Instituto de Hidrologia Meteorologia y Estudios Ambientales

== Gallery ==
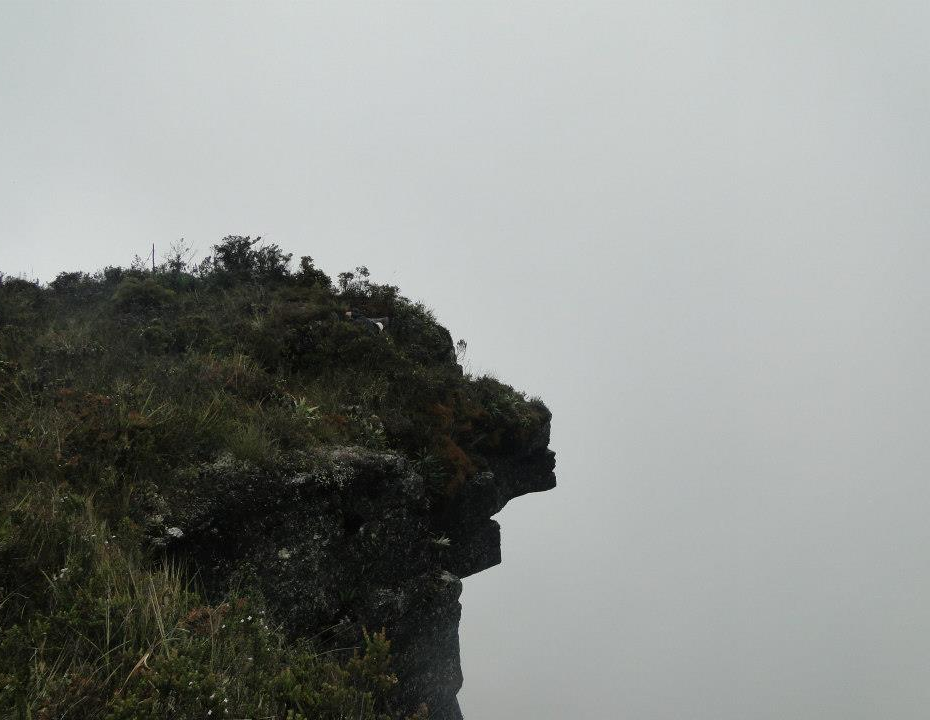
Cara del indio, rock shaped as the face of an Indian

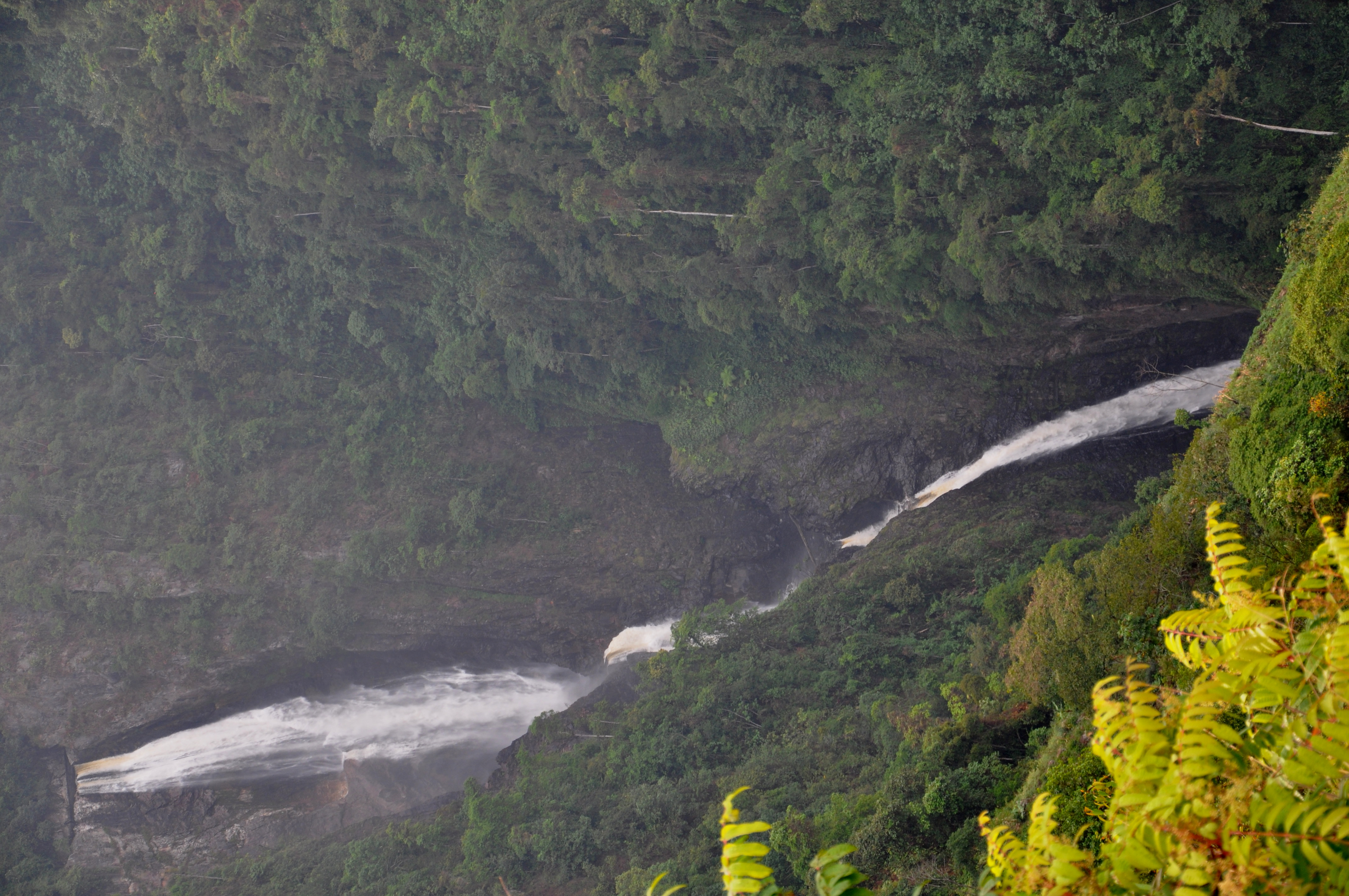
Highest waterfall of Colombia

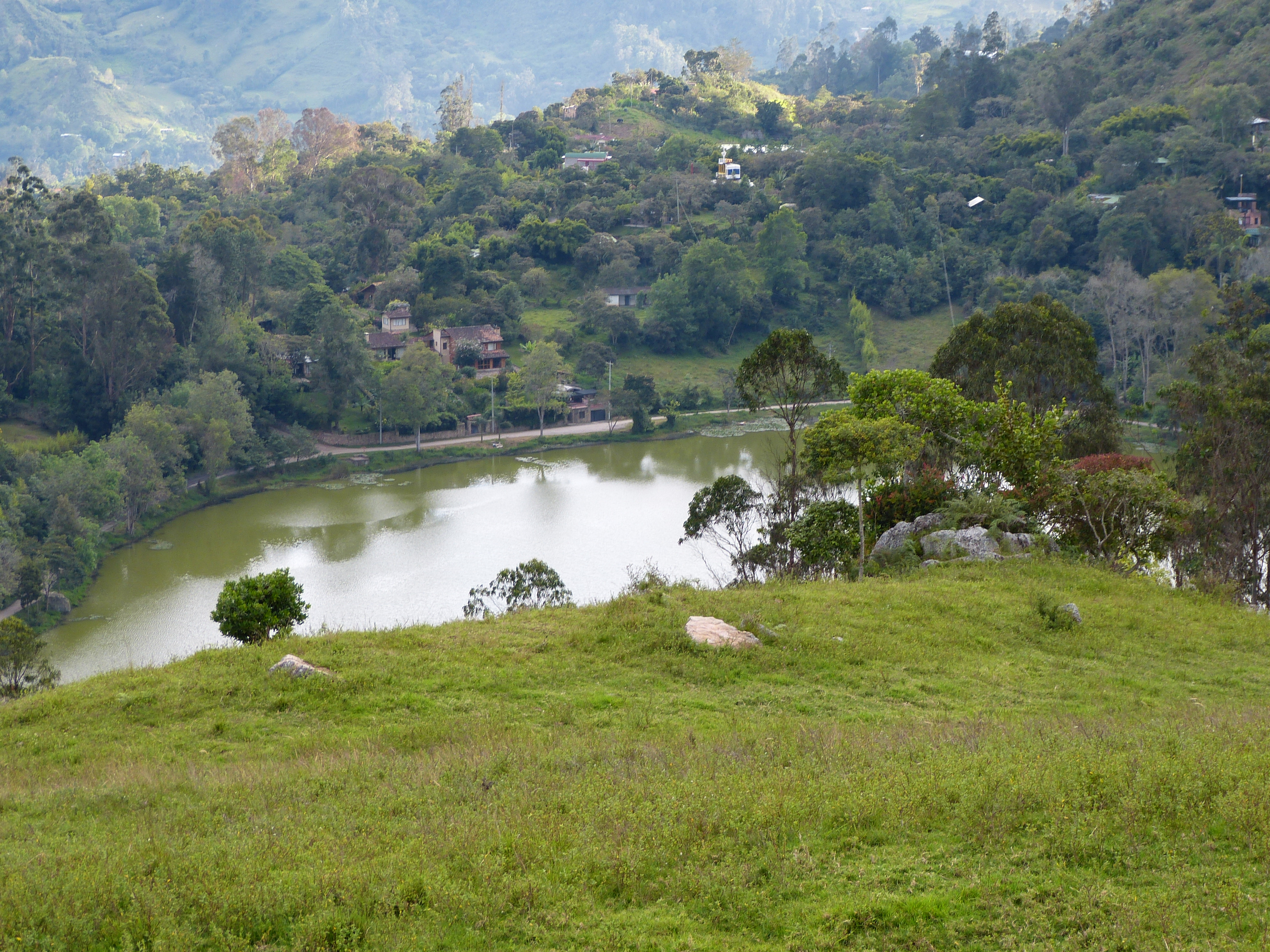
Rural part of Choachí

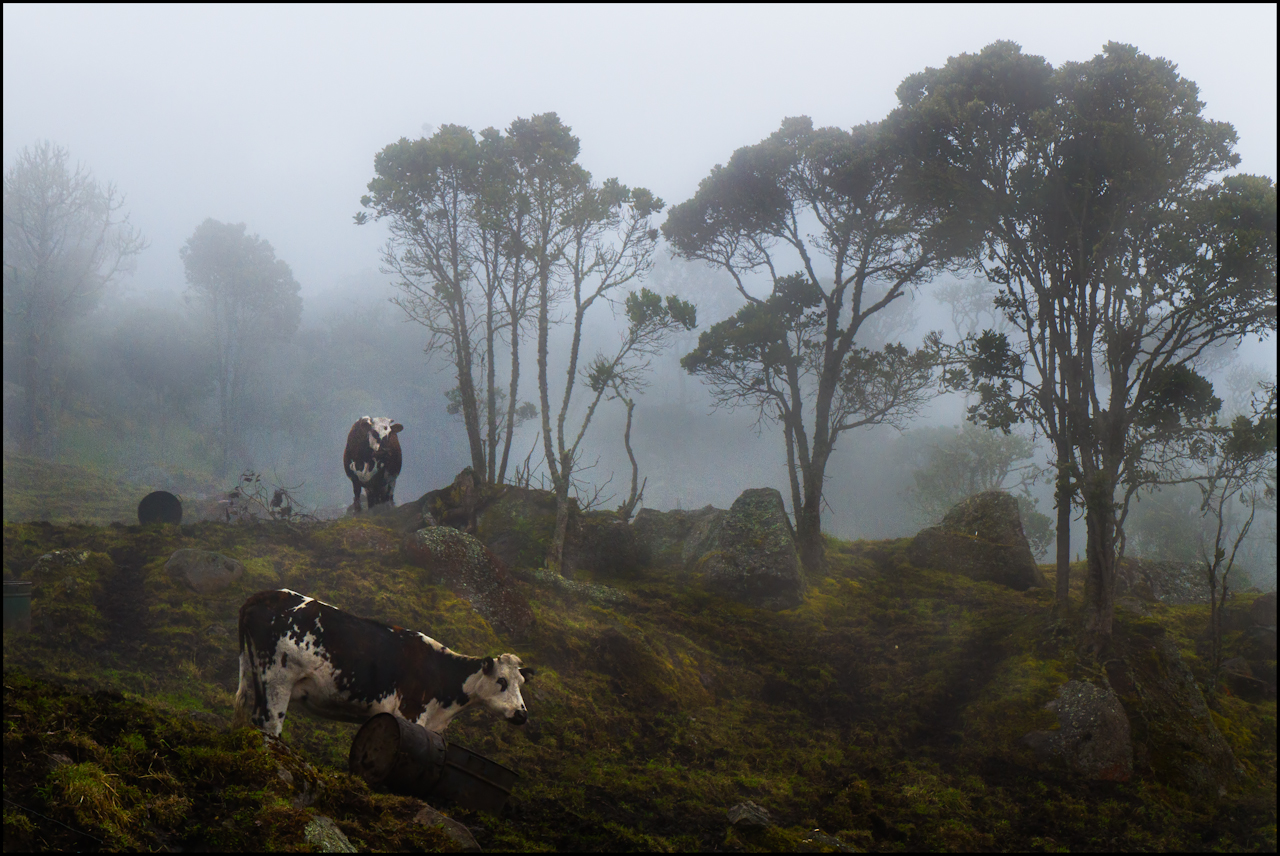
Cows in the fog

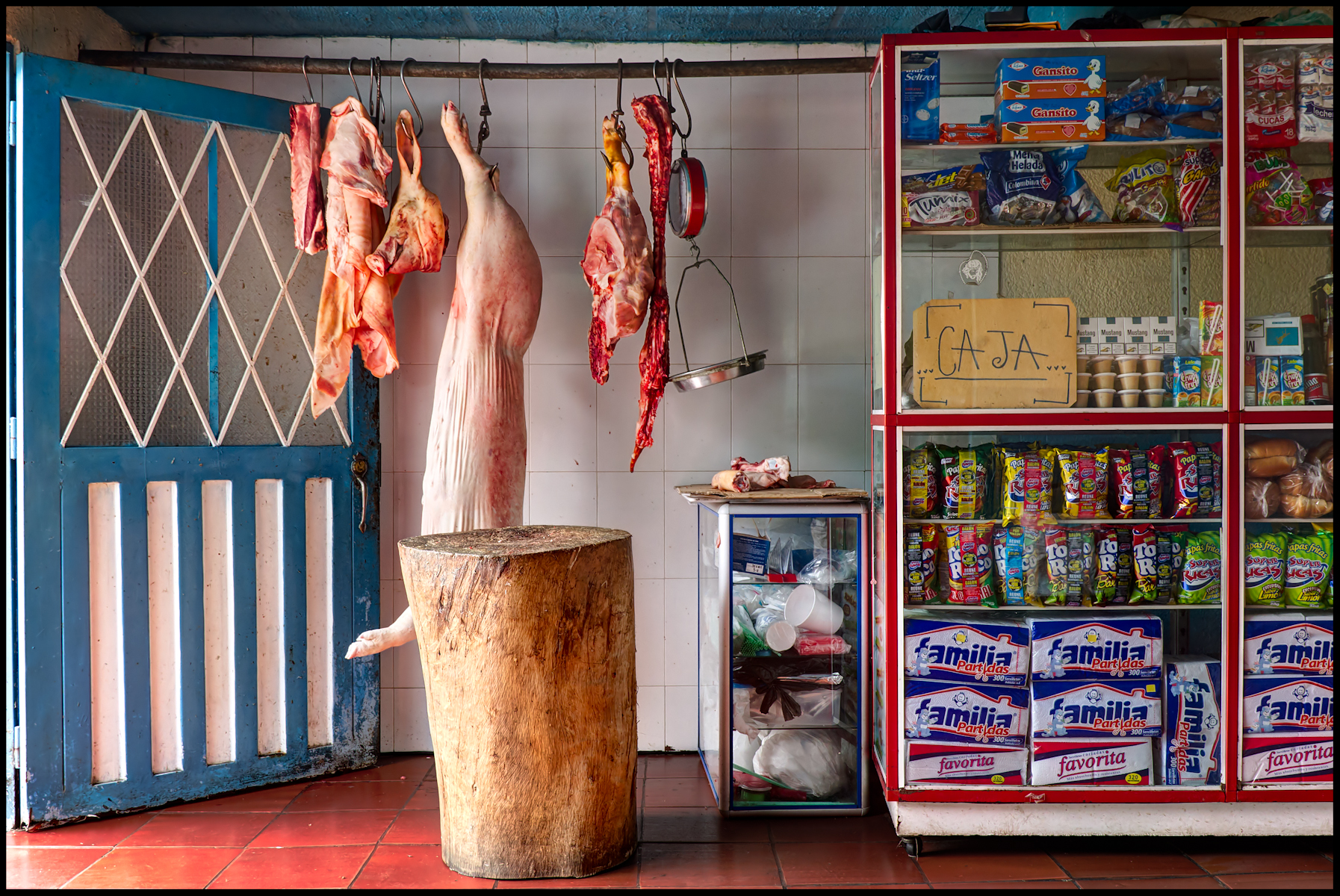
Store in Choachí

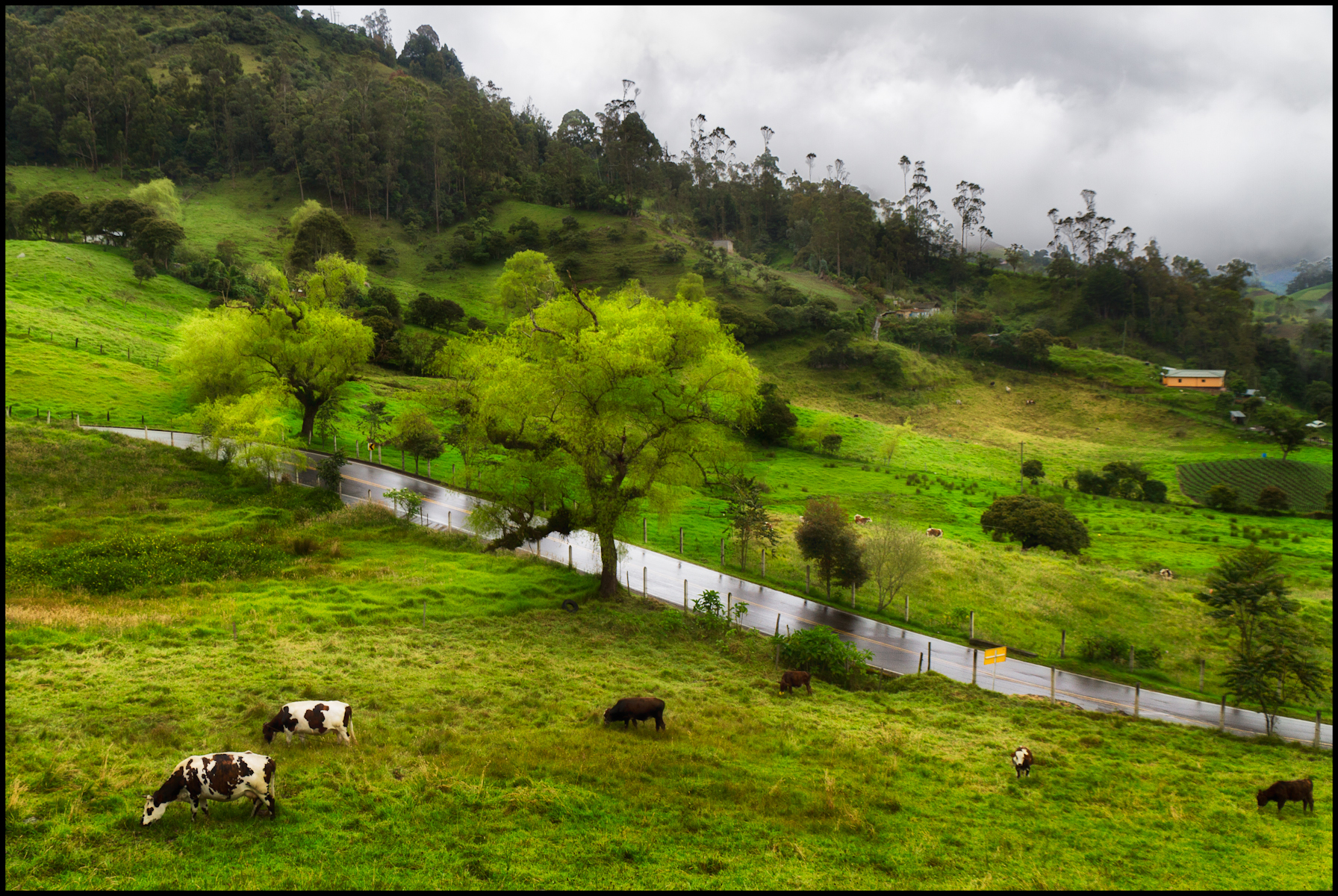
Road to Choachí

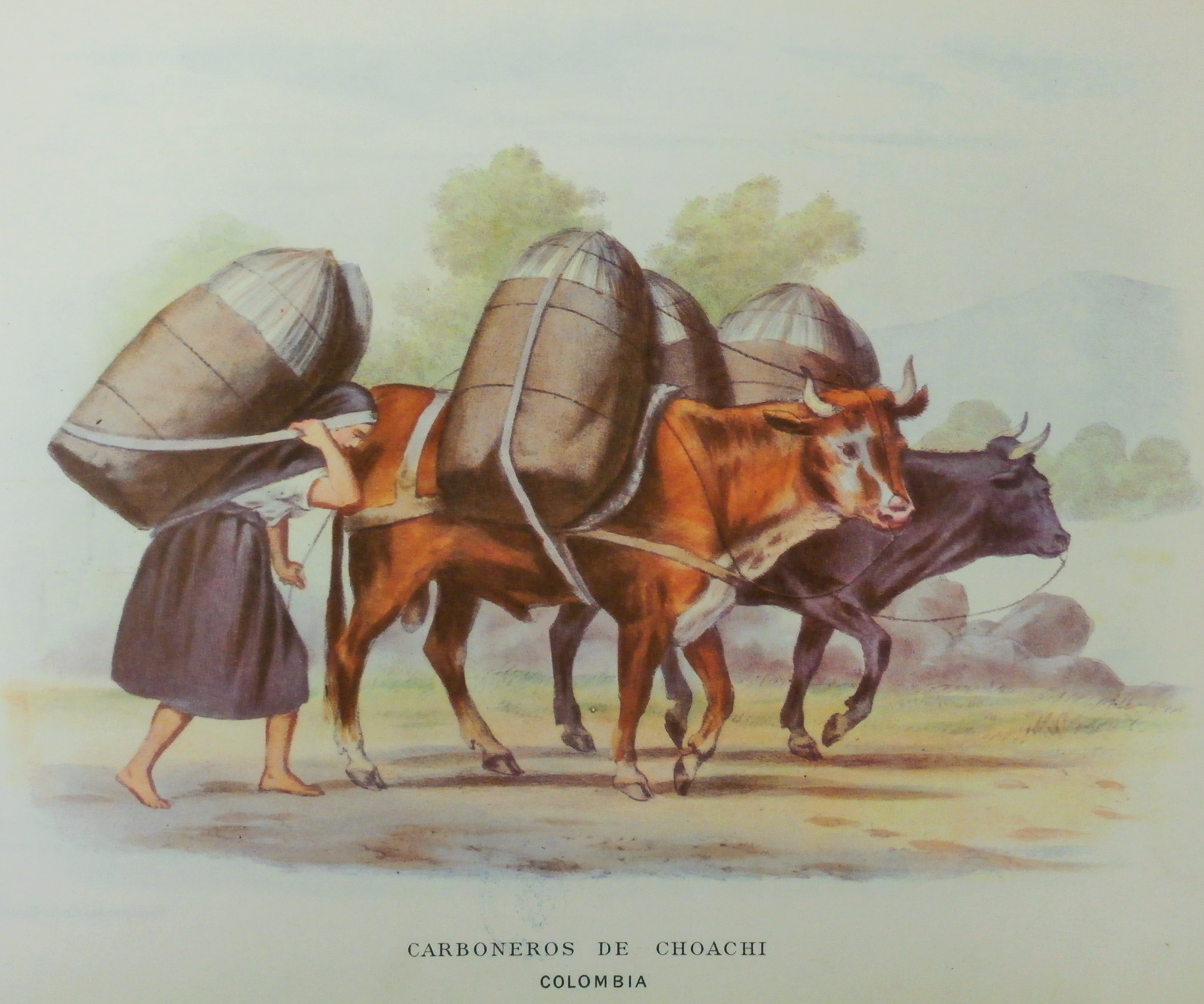
Charcoal burners of Choachí in 1850 by Ramón Torres Méndez.

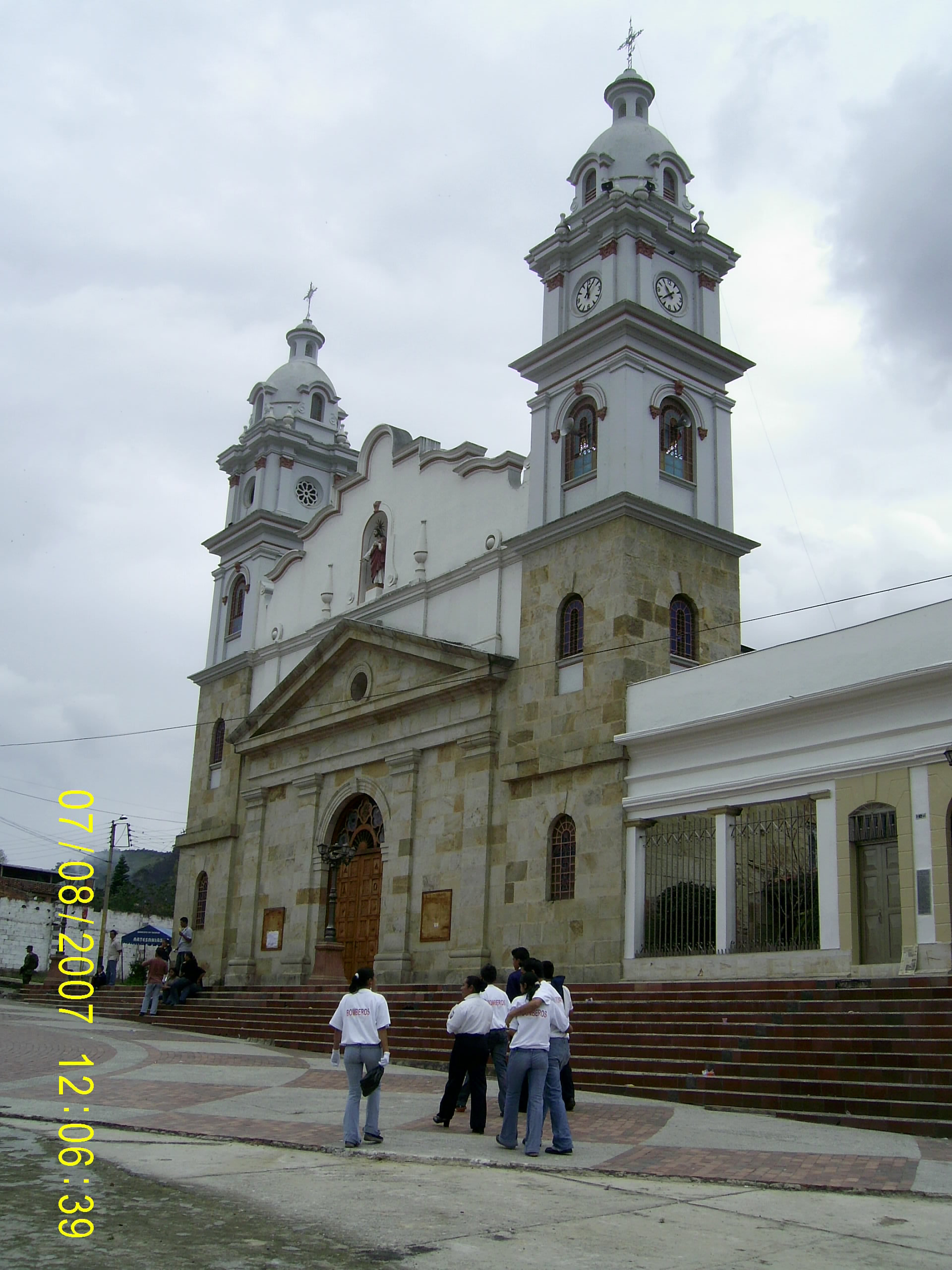
Church of San Miguel in Choachí

== Trivia ==
- A number of episodes of the popular series Escobar, el patrón del mal were filmed in Choachí
- The highest waterfall of Colombia with 590 metres (1,940 ft) is located in Choachí

== Bibliography ==
- Izquierdo Peña, Manuel Arturo (2009), The Muisca Calendar: An approximation to the timekeeping system of the ancient native people of the northeastern Andes of Colombia (PhD), Université de Montréal, pp. 1–170, arXiv:0812.0574
