= Cora hirsuta =

Scientific classification
- Kingdom: Fungi
- Division: Basidiomycota
- Class: Agaricomycetes
- Order: Agaricales
- Family: Hygrophoraceae
- Genus: Cora
- Species: C. hirsuta

Binomial name
- Cora hirsuta (B.Moncada & Lücking) Moncada & Lücking (2013)

Synonyms
- Dictyonema hirsutum B.Moncada & Lücking (2011)

Species of lichen

Cora hirsuta (previously Dictyonema hirsutum) is a species of basidiolichen in the family Hygrophoraceae. Found in the páramo region near Bogotá at over 3,000 m (9,800 ft) elevation, it was described as new to science in 2011. The lichen, characterised by its distinctively hairy upper surface and smaller lobes, thrives in a variety of habitats, including soil, bryophytes, and as epiphytes on trees.

== Taxonomy ==
Cora hirsuta was first described by lichenologists Bibiana Moncada and Robert Lücking as the new species Dictyonema hirsutum, distinct from Dictyonema glabratum due to its hairy thallus. The type specimen was collected in August 2008 from the Reserva Natural Matarredonda in Choachí, Cundinamarca, Colombia. The species name hirsuta is derived from the Latin word for hairy, referring to the lichen's conspicuously hairy upper surface. Moncada and Lücking transferred the taxon to the genus Cora in 2013.

== Description ==
The thallus of Cora hirsuta is foliose, featuring semicircular to flabellate lobes ranging from 0.5–1 cm (0.2–0.4 in) in diameter and 200–300 μm in thickness. The upper surface is densely covered with obliquely oriented, white trichomes, which are 0.3–0.5 mm long and 20–30 μm thick at the base. These trichomes give the lichen its characteristic hairy appearance. The area near the lobe margin is usually glabrous and olive-green, while the rest of the surface appears white. The lower surface is ecorticate, finely felty-byssoid, and mottled pale brownish to bluish grey.

Cora hirsuta is distinguished from the similar D. glabratum by its densely hairy upper surface and smaller lobes. It is possible that Cora pavonia f. villosa Tomas may represent the same taxon, but this has not been confirmed. Another similar species is Cora byssoidea, also found in Colombia at the same locality. It differs by its solely epiphytic growth, and arachnoid tomentum that is only marginally present.

== Habitat and distribution ==
Cora hirsuta is known to inhabit the páramo region near Bogota, Colombia, at elevations above 3,000 metres (9,800 ft). The foliose forms of the genus Dictyonema are the most commonly collected basidiolichens, often found growing on soil, between bryophytes or as epiphytes on trees. Because of its small thalli, Cora hirsuta, however, can easily be overlooked among vegetation, although it is quite conspicuous up close due to its peculiar morphology.
