= Guayabetal =

- Municipality and town
- Flag Coat of arms

- Location of the municipality and town inside Cundinamarca Department of Colombia

- Location in Colombia
- Coordinates: 4°12′55″N 73°48′52″W
- Country: Colombia
- Department: Cundinamarca
- Time zone: UTC-5 (Colombia Standard Time)

Guayabetal is a Colombian municipality in the department of Cundinamarca, located in Eastern Province, 65 kilometers southeast of Bogotá.

== History ==
Guayabetal was formed on October 12, 1941, in the place it currently occupies during the 1920s and 1930s, within the jurisdiction of Quetame, and was consolidated with the road to Villavicencio. By Ordinance No. 29 of June 30, 1944, it was established as an inspection area and Ordinance No. 28 of January 14, 1980, created the municipality of Guayabetal. Its first mayor was Manuel Gilberto González. On March 29, 1949, by Archdiocesan decree, the church of Our Lady of Carmen of Guayabetal was erected as a parish of the Archdiocese of Bogotá.

On June 28, 1974, near Guayabetal on the Highway to the Llano, the Quebrada Blanca Tragedy occurred when a landslide buried more than 500 people waiting to pass, after the road was blocked by a previous landslide.

In January 2018, while construction work was being done on the viaduct at the Chirajara site southeast of Guayabetal, the structure collapsed, causing significant damage and killing 9 workers.

== Political & Administrative Division ==
In addition to its municipal seat, Guayabetal has jurisdiction over the following population centers:

- Las Mesas
- Las Mesetas
- Limoncitos
- Monterredondo
- San Antonio
- San Miguel

Furthermore, the municipality is composed of the following rural areas:

- Jaboneras
- Tunque
- San Marcos
- San Roque
- El Naranjal
- Fundiciones
- La Palma
- Gaques
- El Laurel
- Conucos
- El Espinal
- Encenillos
- Las Mesas
- Casa de Teja
- Chirajara Alta
- Susumuco
- Chirajara Baja
- Vanguardia
- Chipaque
- Mesagrande

== Economy ==
The municipality has a significant deficiency in the employment sector due to its large expanse of rugged terrain that prevents the full utilization of arable land. Moreover, due to the major tourist attraction of the central city, such as Villavicencio, the economy generally revolves around the Llano Road (restaurants, cafeterias, workshops, lodgings, etc.).

This is the main source of income for the inhabitants of the municipal seat. Only small producers who have some way to commercialize their products do so in Villavicencio, while others are affected by the purchase of intermediaries who acquire their products at low prices. The rural population is dedicated to agriculture, mainly growing coffee and beans, which forms the economic base of the peasant farmer.

== Educational Institutions ==
- Monseñor Alberto Reyes Fonseca
- Instituto Clara Theresia

== Tourist Attractions ==
- The beaches of Rio Blanco
- The plateau
- Quebrada Las Perdices
- Las cuchillas
- El limonar
- Pan de sagú
- The Boyacense arepa
- Ancestral paths, also known as royal roads
- Sanctuary Virgin of Chirajara and Church Our Lady of Carmen
- Hiking
- Bird watching
- Canyoning
- Tubing
- Rappelling
- Speleology

== Transport ==
Guayabetal can be reached from Bogotá (Usme locality) via National Route 40 to the southeast or by the same road from Villavicencio to the west, directly arriving at the urban center of Guayabetal.
