= Ubaque =

- Municipality and town
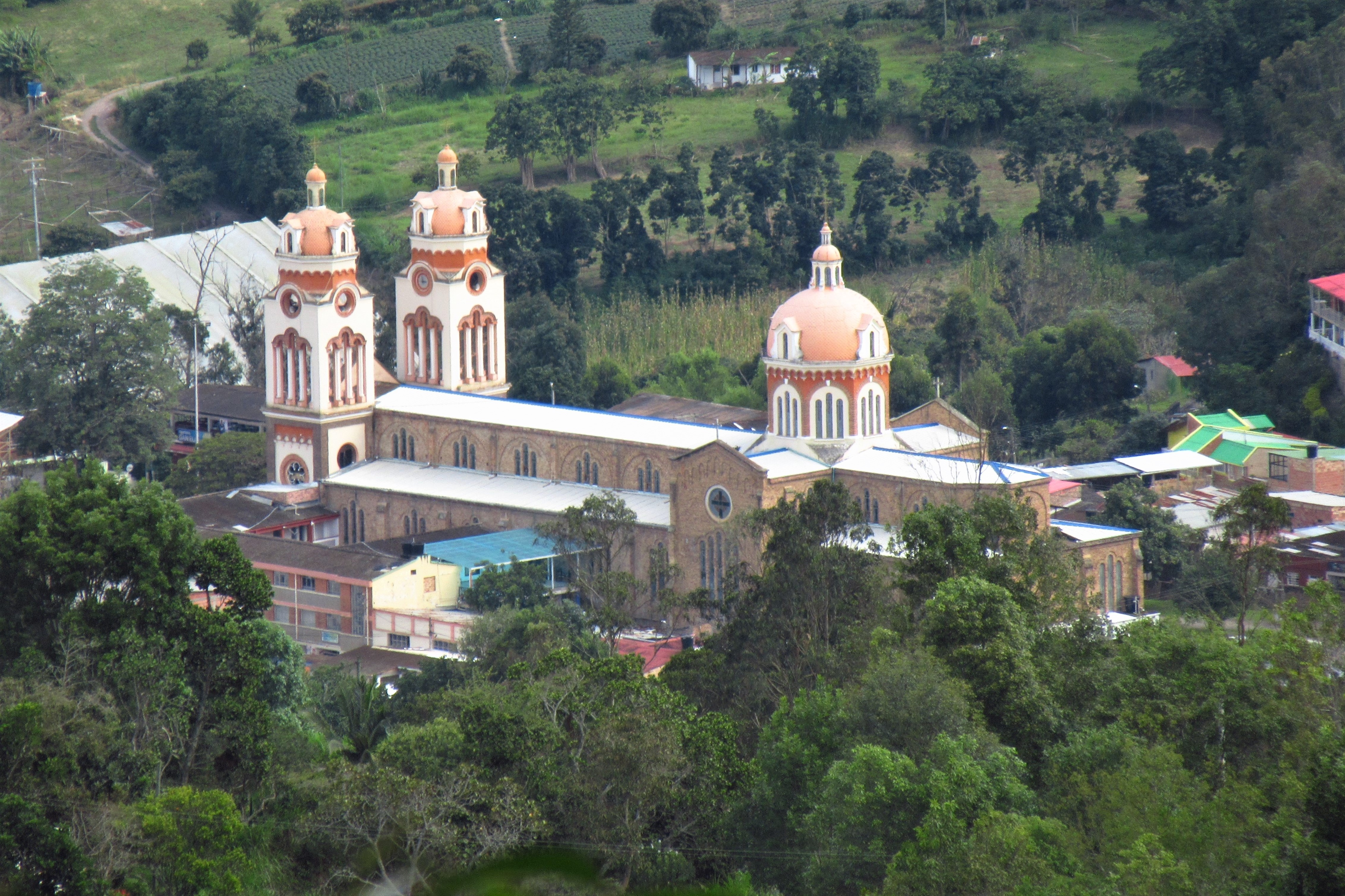
- View of Ubaque

- Flag Coat of arms

- Location of the municipality and town inside Cundinamarca Department of Colombia

- Location in Colombia
- Coordinates: 4°28′59″N 73°56′4″W
- Country: Colombia
- Department: Cundinamarca
- Province: Eastern Province
- Founded: 15 October 1651
- Founder: Custodio Lesaca

Government
  - Mayor: Jhovany Osvaldo Garzón Aguas (2024-2027)

Area
  - Municipality and town: 104.96 km^{2} (40.53 sq mi)
  - Urban: 0.14 km^{2} (0.054 sq mi)
- Elevation: 1,867 m (6,125 ft)

Population (2015)
  - Municipality and town: 6,166
  - Density: 58.75/km^{2} (152.2/sq mi)
  - Urban: 879
- Time zone: UTC-5 (Colombia Standard Time)
- Website: Official website

Ubaque is a municipality and town of Colombia in the Eastern Province of the department of Cundinamarca. Ubaque borders the municipalities Choachí in the north, Fómeque in the east, Cáqueza and Chipaque in the south and in the west is the Colombian capital Bogotá at 56 km away.

== History ==
The area around Ubaque was before the Spanish conquest in the 1530s inhabited by the indigenous Muisca, organised in a confederation. The capital of the southern Muisca territories was Muyquytá, present-day Funza, to the west of Ubaque with ruler Saguamanchica. Ubaque was ruled by a cacique who was loyal to the northern Muisca with capital Hunza until Saguamanchica's successor, the brutal leader Nemequene conquered Ubaque.

The arrival of the Spanish conquerors was revealed to psihipqua Bogotá, succeeding the throne after the death of Nemequene. Tisquesusa reigned the southern Muisca at the time of arrival of the Spanish, led by Gonzalo Jiménez de Quesada. Mohan Popón who lived in Ubaque told the Muisca ruler that foreigners were coming and Bogotá would die "bathing in his own blood".

The troops of De Quesada conquered the Muisca Confederation and on October 15, 1651, Ubaque was properly founded.

The etymology of Ubaque is not entirely clear. The name could be derived from Ybaque (the Chibcha word for a blooding Eucalyptus tree, common in the Andes) or from the word Ebaque.

== Economy ==
Main economical activity of Ubaque, where 98% of the people live in rural areas, is agriculture, particularly potatoes and carrots.

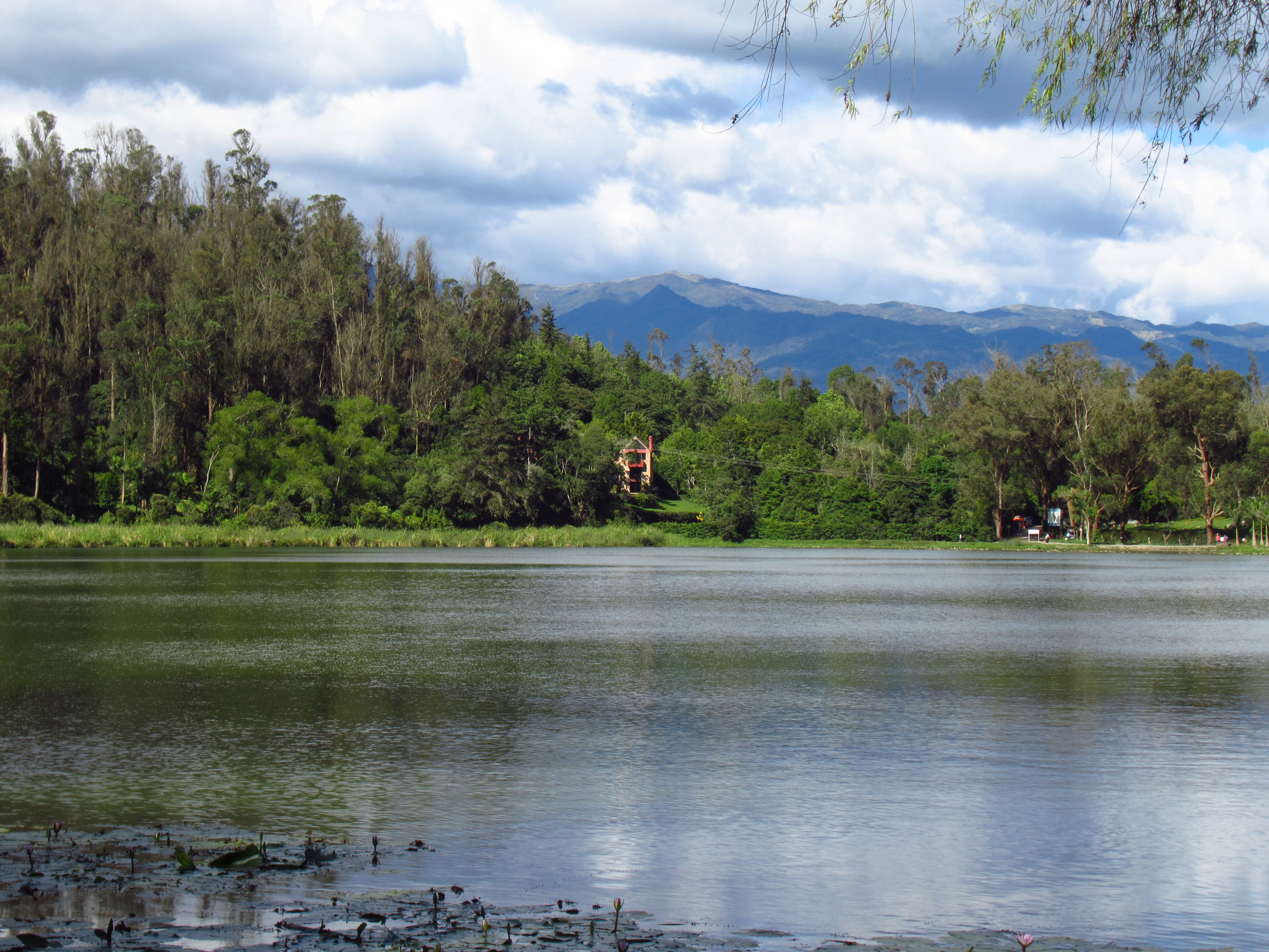
Lake Ubaque

== Lake Ubaque ==
Lake Ubaque or Lake El Cacique is a sacred lake in the religion of the Muisca, located within the boundaries of Ubaque. It was in Ubaque where the last public religious ceremony of the Muisca was performed, on December 27, 1563.

== Born in Ubaque ==
- Jaime Pardo Leal, former politician (assassinated)

== Climate ==
Climate data for Ubaque (Llano Largo), elevation 2,980 m (9,780 ft), (1981–2010)
| Month | Jan | Feb | Mar | Apr | May | Jun | Jul | Aug | Sep | Oct | Nov | Dec | Year |
|---|---|---|---|---|---|---|---|---|---|---|---|---|---|
| Mean daily maximum °C (°F) | 14.6 (58.3) | 14.8 (58.6) | 14.6 (58.3) | 14.1 (57.4) | 13.7 (56.7) | 12.7 (54.9) | 12.1 (53.8) | 12.4 (54.3) | 13.4 (56.1) | 14.1 (57.4) | 14.3 (57.7) | 14.4 (57.9) | 13.8 (56.8) |
| Daily mean °C (°F) | 11.7 (53.1) | 11.6 (52.9) | 11.6 (52.9) | 11.5 (52.7) | 11.4 (52.5) | 10.8 (51.4) | 10.2 (50.4) | 10.3 (50.5) | 11.1 (52.0) | 11.6 (52.9) | 11.8 (53.2) | 11.8 (53.2) | 11.3 (52.3) |
| Mean daily minimum °C (°F) | 5.7 (42.3) | 5.8 (42.4) | 6.3 (43.3) | 6.9 (44.4) | 6.9 (44.4) | 6.5 (43.7) | 6.1 (43.0) | 6.1 (43.0) | 6.0 (42.8) | 6.3 (43.3) | 6.6 (43.9) | 6.3 (43.3) | 6.3 (43.3) |
| Average precipitation mm (inches) | 33.0 (1.30) | 53.0 (2.09) | 76.4 (3.01) | 114.9 (4.52) | 168.9 (6.65) | 169.4 (6.67) | 172.0 (6.77) | 139.5 (5.49) | 91.9 (3.62) | 97.7 (3.85) | 108.2 (4.26) | 54.6 (2.15) | 1,255.9 (49.44) |
| Average precipitation days | 7 | 8 | 12 | 16 | 22 | 22 | 24 | 21 | 15 | 15 | 15 | 10 | 185 |
| Average relative humidity (%) | 90 | 89 | 91 | 91 | 92 | 93 | 94 | 94 | 92 | 90 | 90 | 90 | 91 |
Source: Instituto de Hidrologia Meteorologia y Estudios Ambientales
