= Gutiérrez, Cundinamarca =

Gutiérrez
- Municipality and town
- Flag Coat of arms

- Location of the municipality and town inside Cundinamarca Department of Colombia

- Location in Colombia
- Coordinates: 4°15′N 74°0′W
- Country: Colombia
- Department: Cundinamarca
- Elevation: 2,350 m (7,710 ft)
- Time zone: UTC-5 (Colombia Standard Time)

Gutiérrez (Spanish pronunciation: [ɡuˈtjeres]) is a municipality and town of Colombia in the department of Cundinamarca.
