= Fómeque =

- Municipality and town
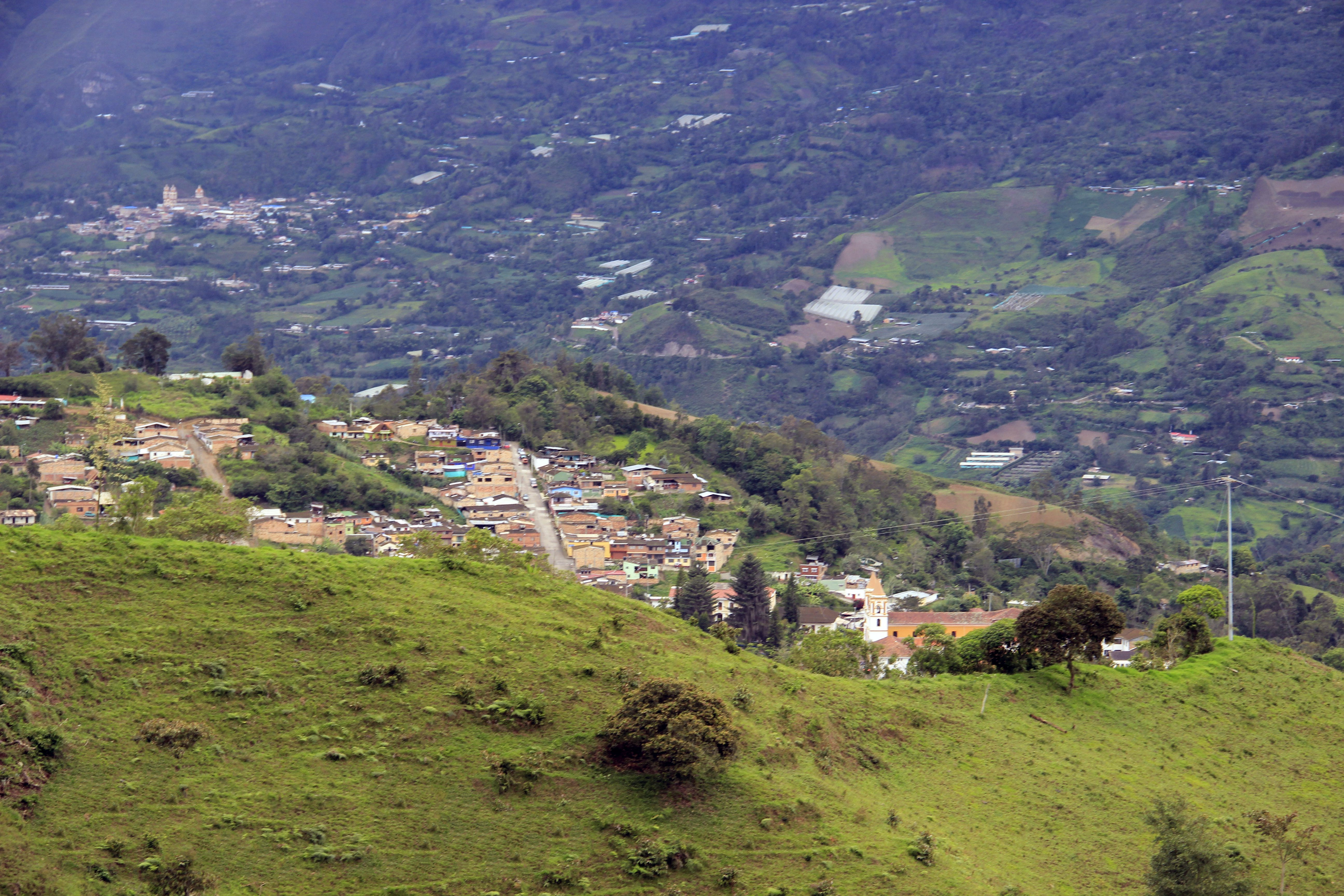

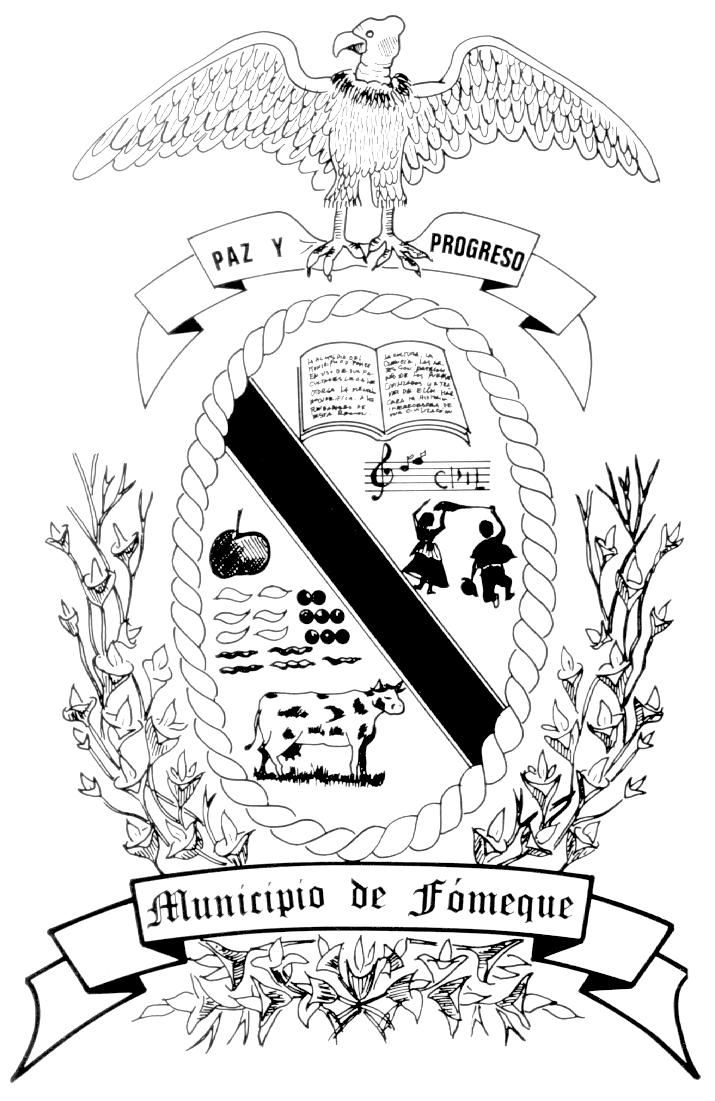
- Flag Coat of arms

- Location of the municipality and town inside Cundinamarca Department of Colombia

- Location in Colombia
- Coordinates: 4°29′5″N 73°53′37″W
- Country: Colombia
- Department: Cundinamarca

Population (2015)
  - Total: 12,214
- Time zone: UTC-5 (Colombia Standard Time)

Fómeque is a municipality and town of Colombia in the department of Cundinamarca.
