= Molinos (TransMilenio) =

Bus station in Bogota, Colombia

General information
- Location: Avenida Caracas with Carrera 9 and Calle 51 sur Tunjuelito and Rafael Uribe Uribe neighborhood
- Line: Caracas Sur - Usme
- Platforms: 2

History
- Opened: June 23, 2001

Services
Preceding station	TransMilenio	Following station
Consuelo towards Tercer Milenio	H	Danubio towards Portal de Usme or Portal del Tunal
Location

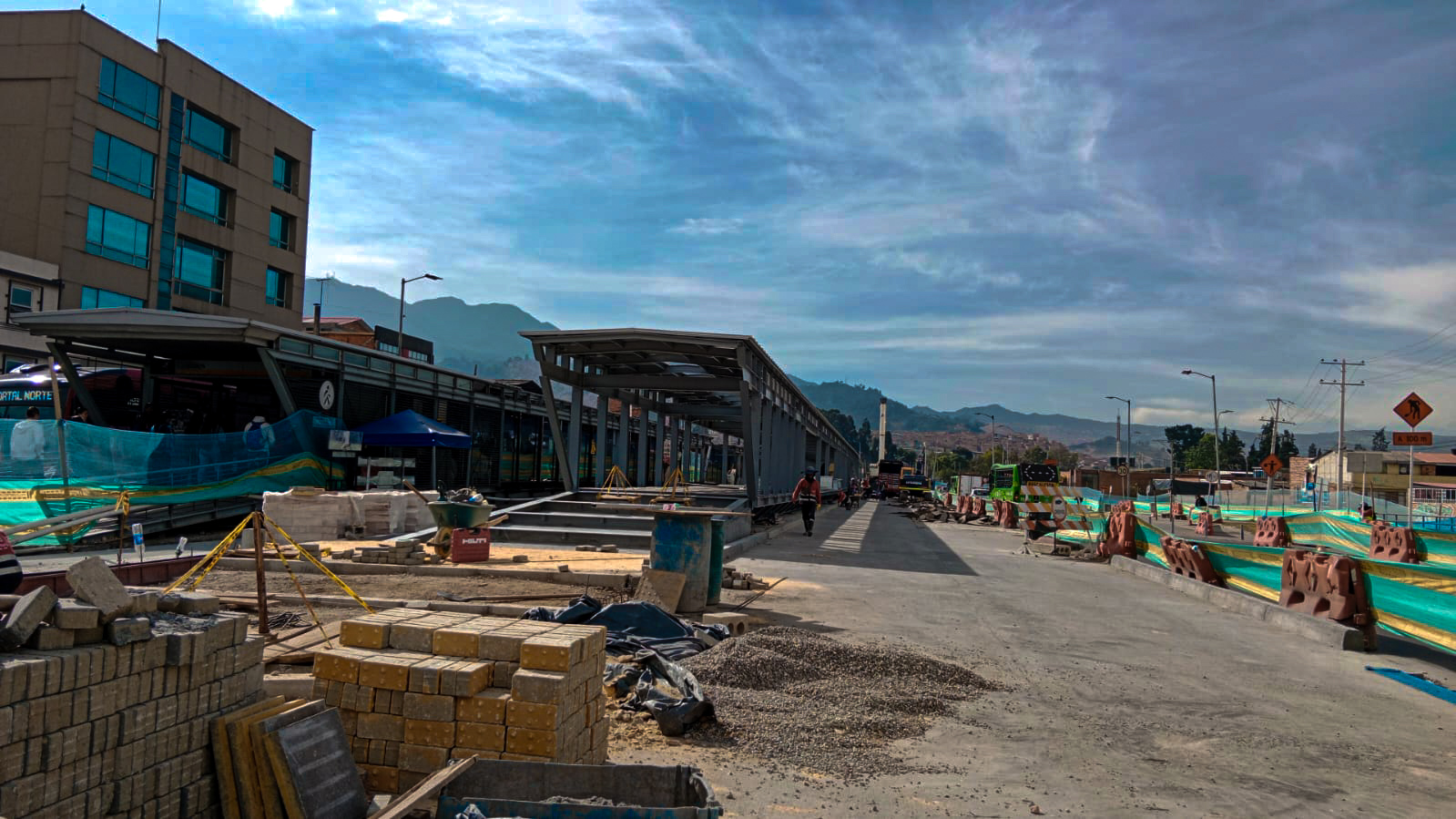
Construction of the current Molinos station, with the previous station on the left, October 2023.

The intermediate station Molinos is part of the TransMilenio mass-transit system of Bogotá, Colombia, opened in the year 2000.

== Location ==
The station is located in southern Bogotá, specifically on Avenida Caracas with Carrera 9 and Calle 51 sur.

It serves the Molinos del Sur and Molinos de la Caracas. With feeder service, it also serves the La Picota and Diana Turbay neighborhoods.

== History ==
At the beginning of 2001, the second phase of the Caracas line of the system was opened from Tercer Milenio to the intermediate station Calle 40 Sur. A few months later, service was extended south to Portal de Usme.

The station is named Molinos due to its proximity to the Molinos del Sur and Molinos de la Caracas neighborhoods.

On January 17, 2015, the south car was closed for remodeling and maintenance work, which was reopened on February 21.

During the 2019 Colombian protests, the station suffered several attacks that considerably affected the glass doors and other infrastructure of the station, which is why it was not operational for several days after what happened.

Due to the expansion works of the Caracas south trunk line, which go from this sector to the Portal de Usme, the station and the pedestrian bridge were relocated and rebuilt a few meters to the west, clearing a section that is part of the new roadway in the south-north direction. With the dismantling of the bridge from January 12, 2023, the partial closure of the station on May 29, and its total closure on December 26 of the same year. The opening of the new station was on January 30, 2024, and the opening of the new pedestrian bridge in August of the same year. A new feeder platform was also built that replaced the previous one, with a larger size and space for a cycle parking, which came into operation on July 1, 2023.

== Station services ==
=== Main services ===
Services provided since April 29, 2006
Express services every day all day	B72 B75 K54	H54 H72 H75
Express services Monday to Saturday all day	D20	H20
Express services Monday to Friday morning rush hour	J76	
Express services Monday to Friday afternoon rush hour		H76

=== Scheme ===
			Carrera 7	South →			
			Pedestrian crossing	Feeder arrival	4-3	4-1	4-2
			Pedestrian crossing	Feeder platform			
← North			Pedestrian crossing	← North			
← North			Pedestrian crossing	← North			
Carrera 9	B75K54	B72D20J76	Pedestrian crossing				
	Wagon 2	Wagon 1	Pedestrian crossing				
Carrera 9	H72H75H76	H20H54	Carrera 7				
South →

=== Feeder services ===
The following feeder routes also operate in this way:

- 4-1 circular route to the Bochica neighborhood
- 4-2 circular route to the Diana Turbay neighborhood
- 4-3 circular route to the Molinos neighborhood

=== Urban services ===
The following urban route works in the same way:

- H728 circular route to the Danubio neighborhood

=== Urban services ===
The following urban routes of the SITP also operate on the outer sides of the station, circulating through the mixed traffic lanes on the Avenida Caracas, with the possibility of transferring using the tarjeta TuLlave:

SITP Bus Stops
Code	Sector	Address	Routes
038A11	H Local Mayor's Office of Tunjuelito	Av. Caracas - KR 8	H530H622H702H706H708H720H721H723H728H907 953
005A12	H Molinos Station	Av. Caracas - KR 7	A708A720G530K721 39 953

== See also ==
- Bogotá
- TransMilenio
- List of TransMilenio Stations
