= Nariño (TransMilenio) =

Transmilenio stop

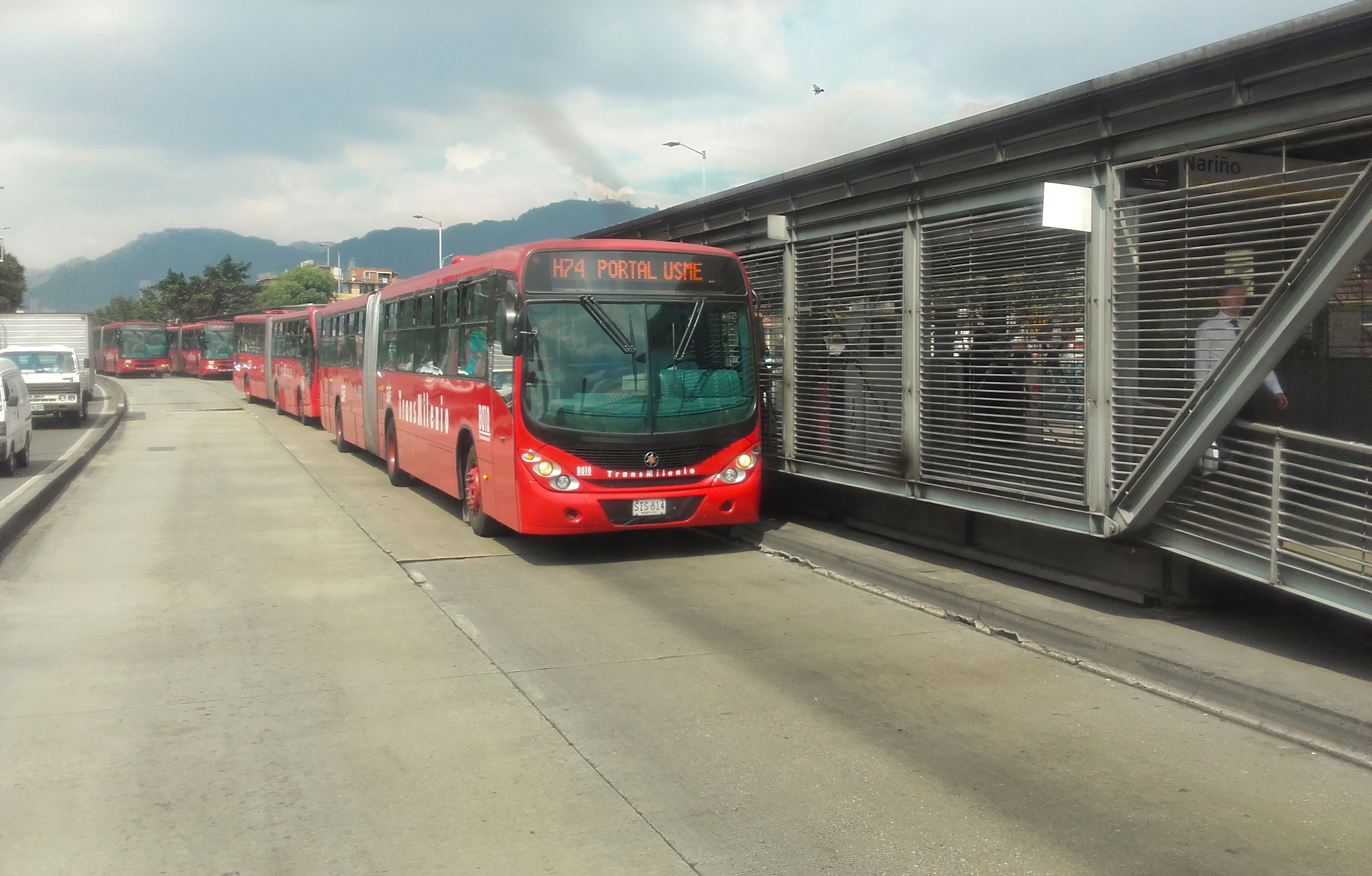

General information
- Location: Avenida Caracas with Calles 10 and 11 sur. Antonio Nariño; Colombia
- Line(s): Caracas Sur
- Platforms: 2

History
- Opened: April 8, 2001

Services
Preceding station	TransMilenio	Following station
Hortúa towards Tercer Milenio	H	Fucha towards Portal de Usme or Portal del Tunal

The simple station Nariño is part of the TransMilenio mass-transit system of Bogotá, Colombia, opened in the year 2001.

== Location ==
The station is located in southern Bogotá, specifically on Avenida Caracas, with Calles 10 and 11 sur.

It serves the neighborhoods of Ciudad Berna and Luna Park.

== History ==
At the beginning of 2001, the second phase of the Caracas line of the system was opened from Tercer Milenio to the intermediate station Calle 40 Sur. A few months later, service was extended south to Portal de Usme.

The station is named Nariño for the ward of the same name in which it is located.

== Station services ==
=== Old trunk services ===
Services rendered until April 29, 2006
Kind	Routes	Frequency
Current	2 Portal Norte 3 Portal Norte	Every 3 minutes on average
Express	Expreso 20 Expreso 90	Every 2 minutes on average

=== Current Trunk Services ===
Service as of April 29, 2006
Type	Northern Routes	Southern Routes
All days	3	3
Express Every day All day	B75 / D21	H21 / H75
Express Every Monday through All day	B72	H72

=== Feeder routes ===
This station does not have connections to feeder routes.

=== Inter-city service ===
This station does not have inter-city service.

== See also ==
- Bogotá
- TransMilenio
- List of TransMilenio Stations
