= Hortúa (TransMilenio) =

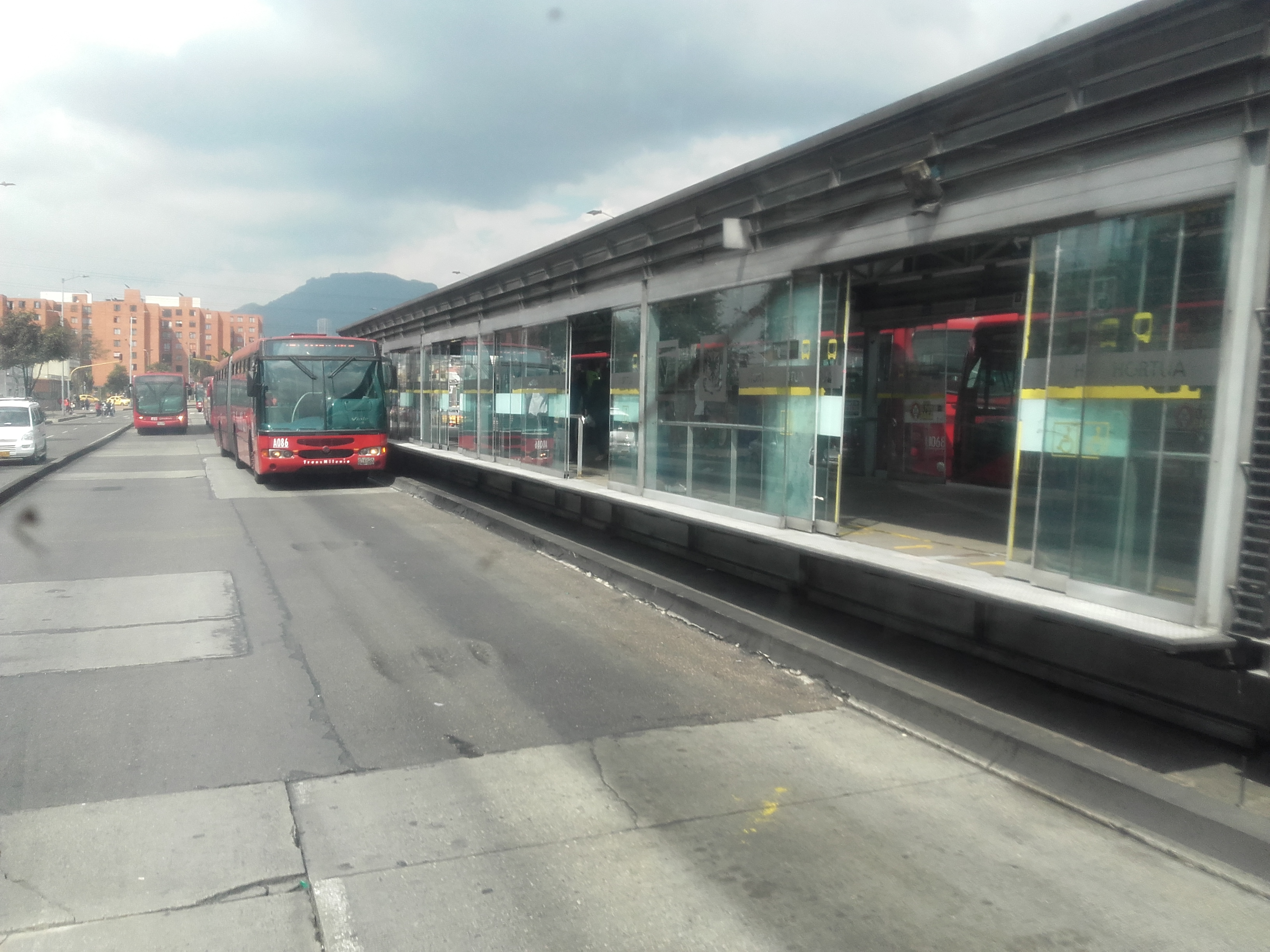

General information
- Location: Avenida Caracas with Calles 1ª and 2ª sur Antonio Nariño, Bogotá; Colombia
- Line: Caracas Sur
- Platforms: 2

History
- Opened: April 8, 2001

Services
Preceding station	TransMilenio	Following station
Hospital towards Tercer Milenio	H	Nariño towards Portal de Usme or Portal del Tunal
Location

Hortúa is a station that is part of the TransMilenio mass-transit system of Bogotá, Colombia.

== Location ==
The station is located in southern Bogotá, specifically on Avenida Caracas with Calles 1ª and 2ª sur.

It serves the Sevilla, San Antonio, and Policarpa Salavarrieta neighborhoods.

== History ==
At the beginning of 2001, the second phase of the Caracas line of the system was opened from Tercer Milenio to the intermediate station Calle 40 Sur. A few months later, service was extended south to Portal de Usme.

The station is named Hortúa due to its proximity to the medical center of the same name.

== Station Services ==
=== Old trunk services ===
Services rendered until April 29, 2006
Kind	Routes	Frequency
Current	2 Portal Norte 3 Portal Norte	Every 3 minutes on average
Express	Expreso 20 Expreso 90	Every 2 minutes on average
Express Dominical	Expreso Dominical 25	Every 3 or 4 minutes on average

=== Main line service ===
Service as of April 29, 2006
Type	Northern Routes	Southern Routes
Local	3	3
Express Every day All day	B75	H75
Express Monday through Saturday; All day	B13 / C17 / K54	H13 / H17 / H54
Express Monday through Saturday; Morning rush	B71	

=== Feeder routes ===
This station does not have connections to feeder routes.

=== Inter-city service ===
This station does not have inter-city service.

== See also ==
- Bogotá
- TransMilenio
- List of TransMilenio Stations
