= Fucha (TransMilenio) =

Bus station in Bogotá, Colombia

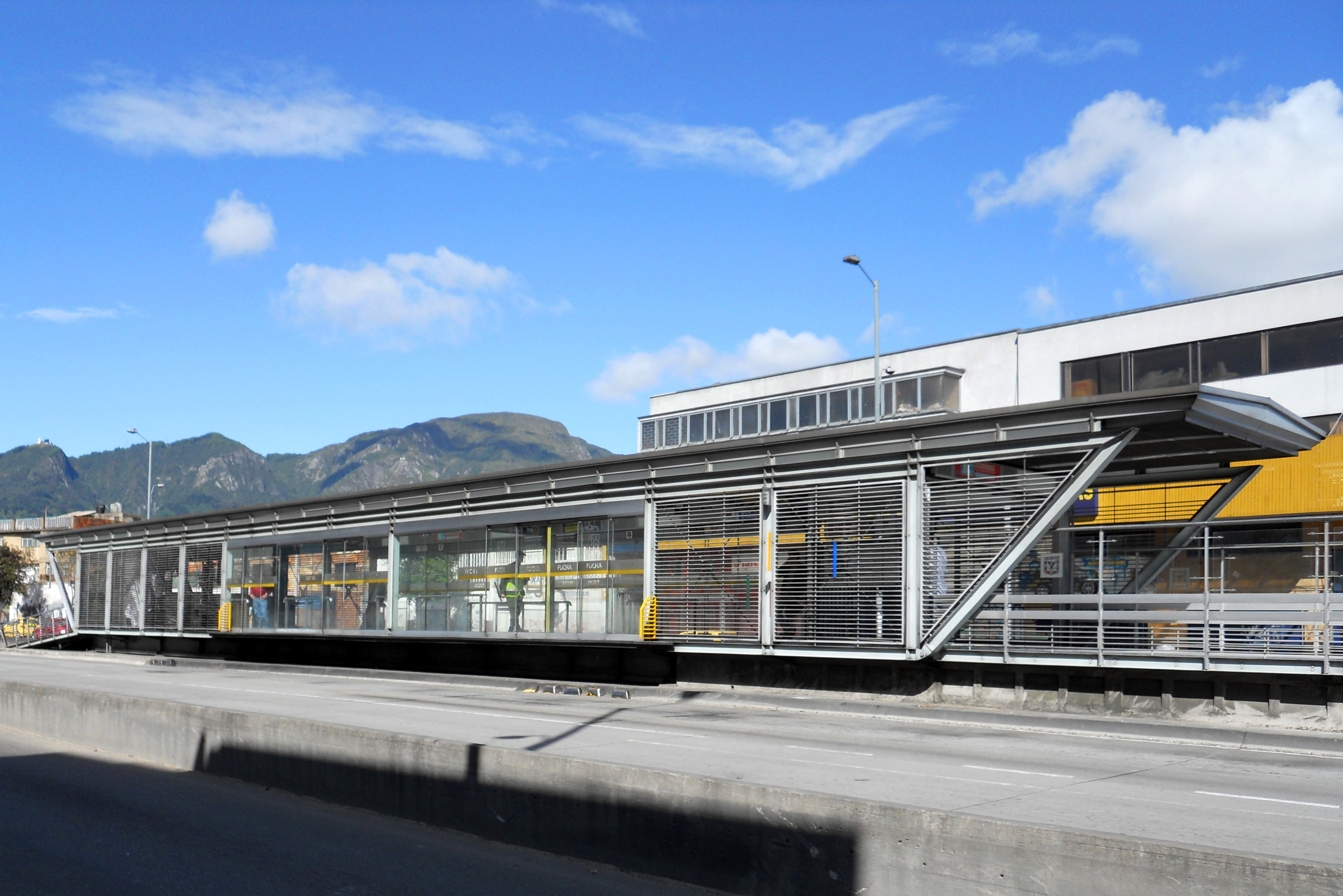

General information
- Location: Avenida Caracas with Calles 17 sur and 18A sur Antonio Nariño
- Line: Caracas Sur
- Platforms: 2

History
- Opened: April 8, 2001

Services
Preceding station	TransMilenio	Following station
Nariño towards Tercer Milenio	H	Restrepo towards Portal de Usme or Portal del Tunal
Location

The simple station Fucha is part of the TransMilenio mass-transit system of Bogotá, Colombia, opened in the year 2000.

== Etymology ==
The station is named Fucha due to its proximity to the channel of the Fucha River, which runs along Calle 13 Sur. Fucha means "her" or "female" in Muysccubun, the language of the indigenous Muisca who inhabited the Bogotá savanna before the Spanish conquest.

== Location ==
The station is located in southern Bogotá, specifically on Avenida Caracas, with Calles 17 and 18A sur.

It serves the Ciudad Jardín and Restrepo neighborhoods.

== History ==
At the beginning of 2001, the second phase of the Caracas line of the system was opened from Tercer Milenio to the intermediate station Calle 40 Sur. A few months later, service was extended south to Portal de Usme.

== Station services ==
=== Old trunk services ===
Services rendered until April 29, 2006
Kind	Routes	Frequency
Current	2 Portal Norte 3 Portal Norte	Every 3 minutes on average
Express	Expreso 30	Every 2 minutes on average
Express Dominical	Expreso Dominical 25	Every 3 or 4 minutes on average

=== Current Trunk Services ===
Service as of April 29, 2006
Type	Northern Routes	Southern Routes
All days	3	3
Express Monday through Saturday; All day	D21 / B72	H21 / H72
Express Monday through Friday; Mixed Service, rush and non-rush		H73

=== Feeder routes ===
This station does not have connections to feeder routes.

=== Inter-city service ===
This station does not have any inter-city service.

== See also ==
- Bogotá
- TransMilenio
- List of TransMilenio Stations
