= Socorro (TransMilenio) =

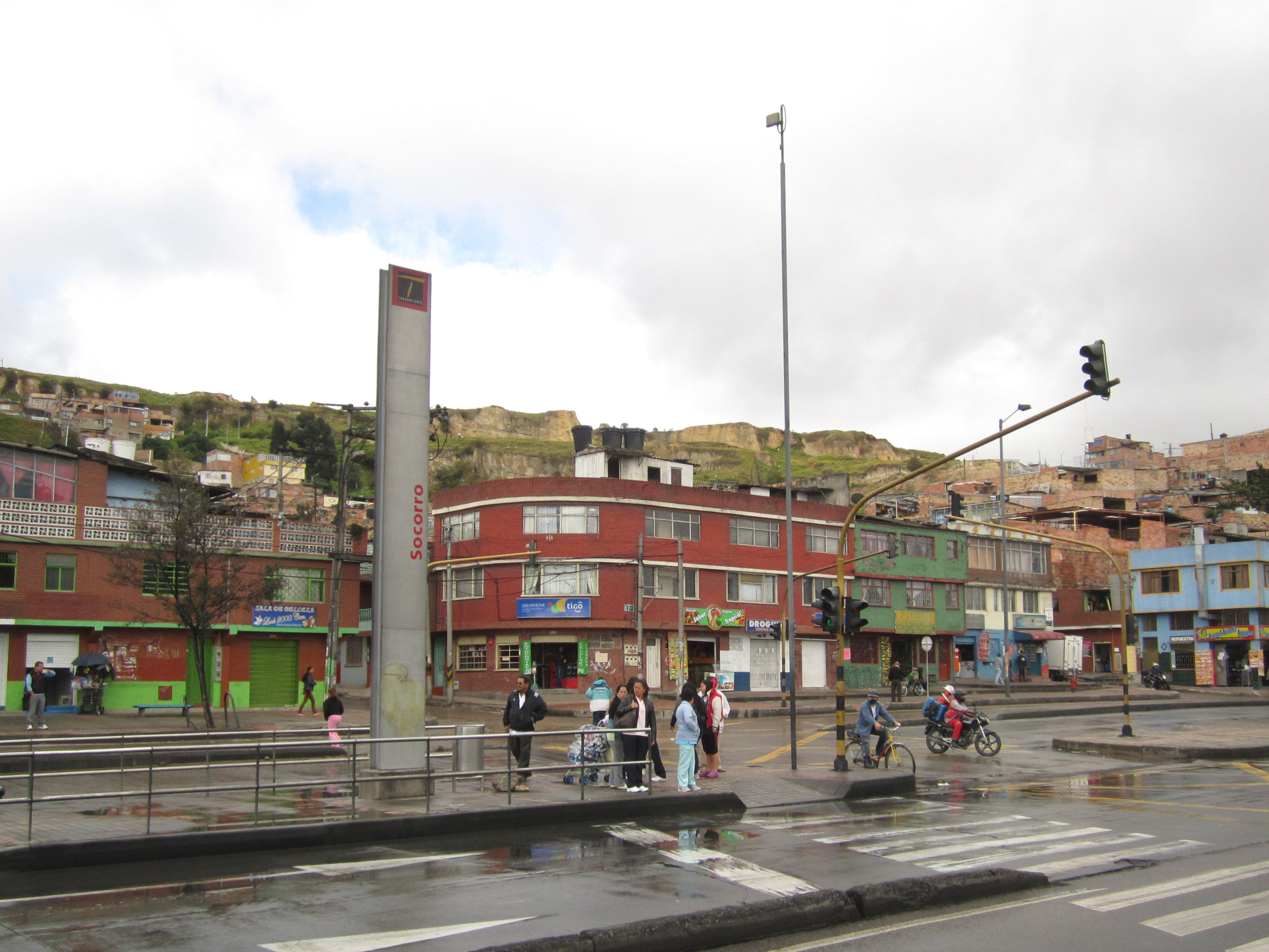

General information
- Location: Av.Calle 51 Sur with Carrera 15; Tunjuelito and Rafael Uribe Uribe neighborhood
- Line: Caracas Sur
- Platforms: 2

History
- Opened: June 23, 2001

Services
Preceding station	TransMilenio	Following station
Santa Lucía towards Tercer Milenio	H	Consuelo towards Portal de Usme or Portal del Tunal
Location

The simple station Socorro is part of the TransMilenio mass-transit system of Bogotá, Colombia, opened in the year 2000.

== Location ==
The station is located in southern Bogotá, specifically on Avenida Caracas with Carreras 15 y 16. It serves the Marco Fidel Suárez and Tunjuelito neighborhoods.

== History ==
At the beginning of 2001, the second phase of the Caracas line of the system was opened from Tercer Milenio to the intermediate station Calle 40 Sur. A few months later, service was extended south to Portal de Usme. In 2021, the station sustained damage during the 2021 Colombian protests, but was repaired and is currently active.

The station is named Socorro after the neighborhood located on its east side.

== Station services ==
=== Trunk Services ===
Services provided since April 29, 2006
Type	Routes to the North	Routes to the South	Routes to the East
Express services every day all day	B72 B75	H72 H75	
Express services Monday to Friday all day	C17	H17	
Express services Monday to Friday morning rush hour			J76
Express services Monday to Friday afternoon rush hour		H76	
Expresos sábados from 4:00 a.m. to 3:00 p.m.	C17	H17	

=== Outline ===
← North
B75J76	B72C17	Carrera 13A
Car 2	Car 1	
H75H76	H17H72	Carrera 13A
South →

=== Urban Services ===
The following urban routes of the SITP also operate on the sides outside the station, circulating on the mixed traffic lanes on Avenida Caracas, with the possibility of transferring using the TuLlave card:

SITP Stops
Code	Sector	Direction	Routes
036A11	H Socorro Station	Av. Caracas - KR 15	H453H530H622H708H720H721 39 577 SE14
003A12	H Br. Marco Fidel Suárez	Av. Caracas - KR 14A	A708A720F453G530K721 39 577 SE14

== See also ==
- Bogotá
- TransMilenio
- List of TransMilenio Stations
