= Olaya (TransMilenio) =

Bus stop in Bogotá, Colombia

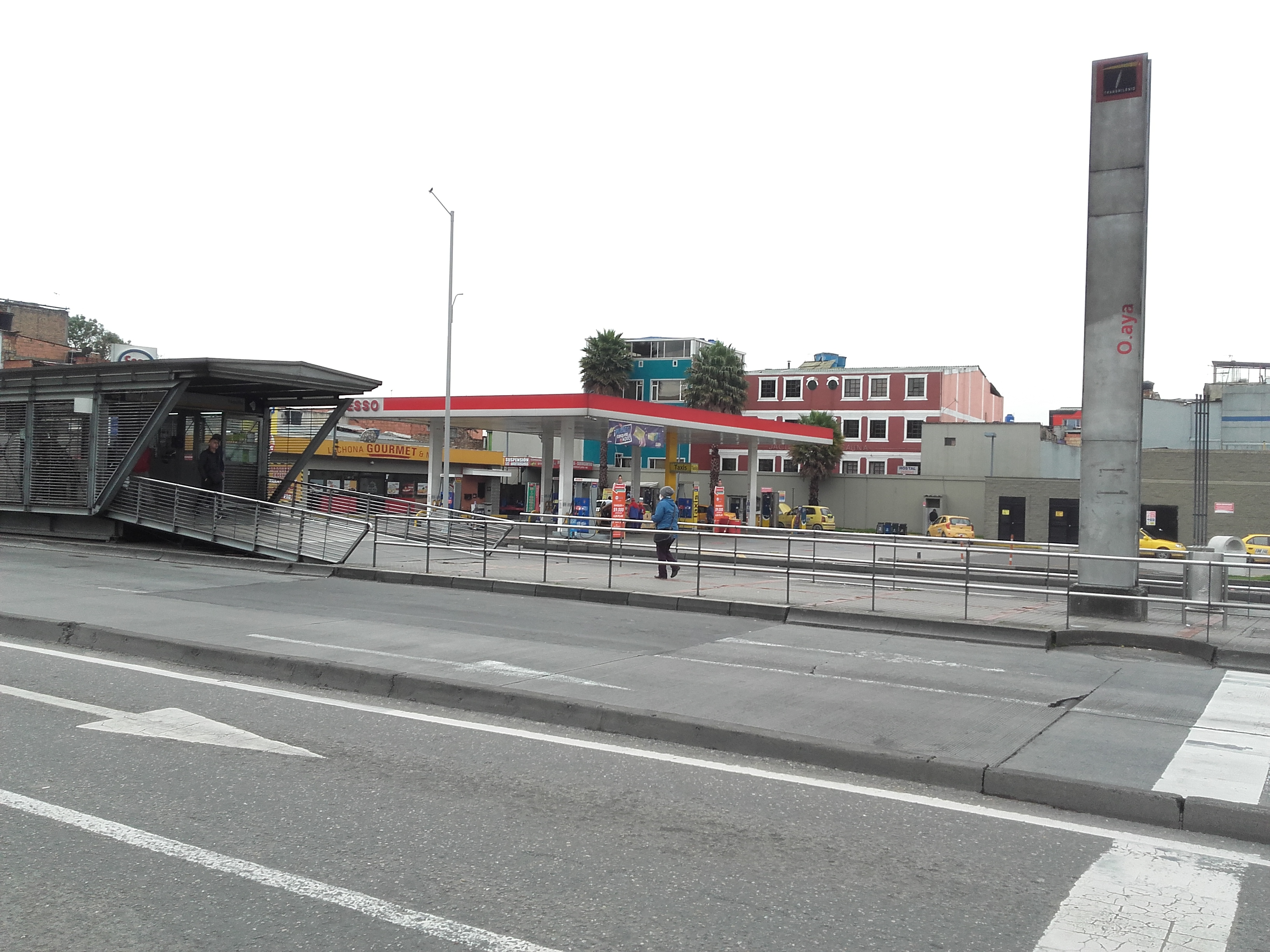

General information
- Location: Avenida Caracas with Calles 27 sur and 28 sur Rafael Uribe Uribe
- Line: Caracas Sur
- Platforms: 2

History
- Opened: June 9, 2001

Services
Preceding station	TransMilenio	Following station
Restrepo towards Tercer Milenio	H	Quiroga towards Portal de Usme or Portal del Tunal
Location

The simple station Olaya is part of the TransMilenio mass-transit system of Bogotá, Colombia, opened in the year 2000.

== Location ==
The station is located in southern Bogotá, specifically on Avenida Caracas, with Calles 27 sur and 28 sur.

== History ==
At the beginning of 2001, the second phase of the Caracas line of the system was opened from Tercer Milenio to the intermediate station Calle 40 Sur. A few months later, service was extended south to Portal de Usme.

The station is named Olaya due to its location in the neighborhood and football stadium of the same name.

== Station services ==
=== Old trunk services ===
Services rendered until April 29, 2006
Kind	Routes	Frequency
Current	2 Portal Norte 3 Portal Norte	Every 3 minutes on average
Express	Expreso 30 Expreso 60 Expreso 70	Every 2 minutes on average
Express Dominical	Expreso Dominical 15	Every 3 or 4 minutes on average

=== Main line service ===
Service as of April 29, 2006
Type	Northern Routes	Southern Routes
Local	3	3
Express Every day All day	C15	H15
Express Monday through Saturday; All day	B72	H72
Express Monday through Saturday; Morning rush	B71	
Express Monday through Saturday; Morning and Evening rush		H73

=== Feeder routes ===
This station does not have connections to feeder routes.

=== Inter-city service ===
This station does not have inter-city service.

== See also ==
- Bogotá
- TransMilenio
- List of TransMilenio Stations
