= Santa Lucía (TransMilenio) =

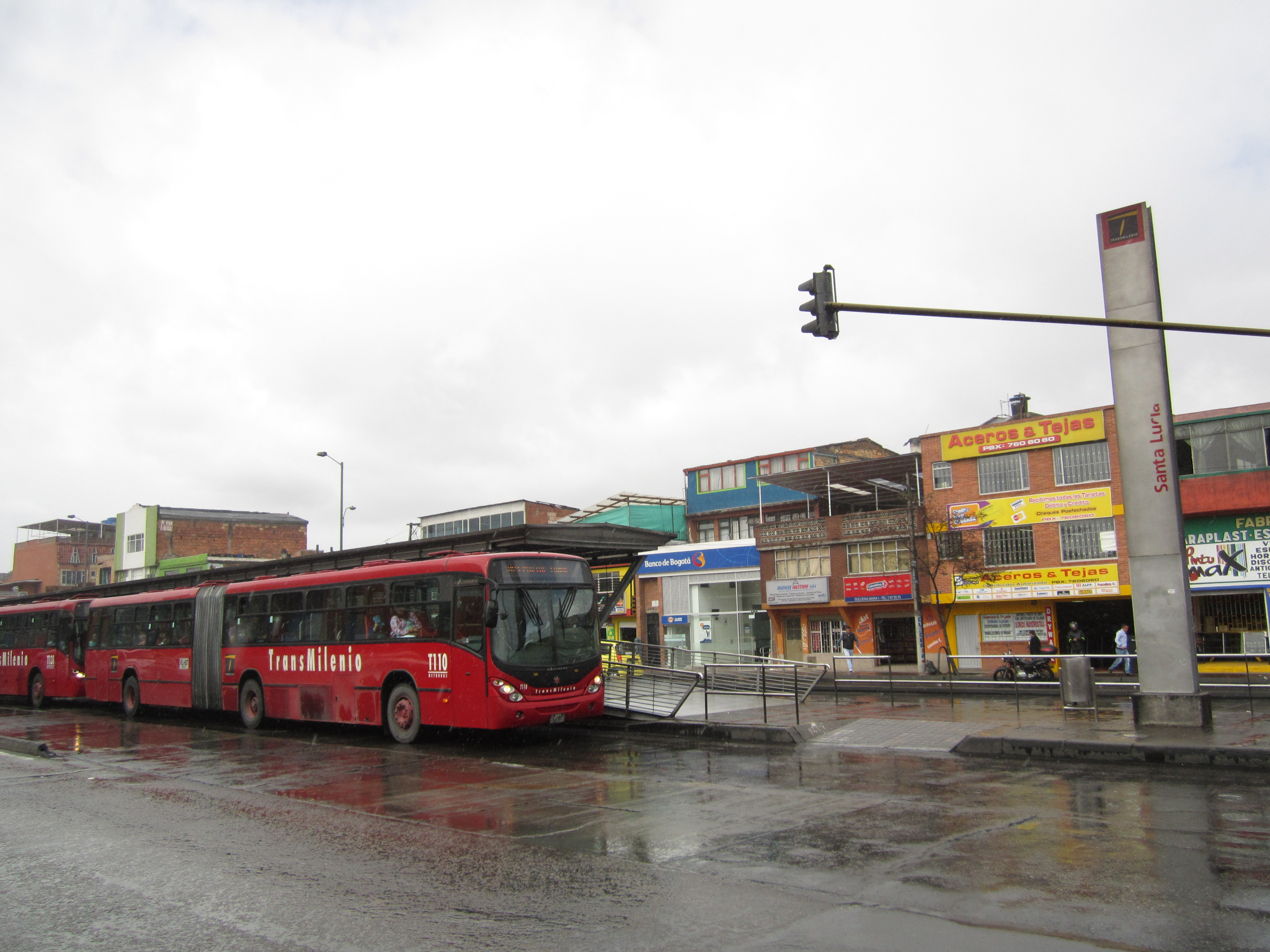

General information
- Location: Avenida Caracas with Calle 45B Sur and Diagonal 46 Sur; Rafael Uribe Uribe and Tunjuelito
- Line: Caracas Sur
- Platforms: 2

History
- Opened: June 23, 2001

Services
Preceding station	TransMilenio	Following station
Calle 40 Sur towards Tercer Milenio	H	Socorro towards Portal de Usme or Portal del Tunal
Terminus	H	Biblioteca towards Portal de Usme or Portal del Tunal
Location

Santa Lucía is a station that is part of the TransMilenio mass-transit system of Bogotá, Colombia.

== Location ==
The station is located in southern Bogotá, specifically on Avenida Caracas with Calle 45B Sur and Diagonal 46 Sur.

It serves the Ciudad Tunal and Claret neighborhoods.

== History ==
Santa Lucía opened on 23 June 2001 as part of the southward extension of the Caracas trunk of TransMilenio. It opened together with the Socorro, Consuelo and Molinos stations, while the Portal de Usme opened later.

The station is named Santa Lucía for the neighborhood of the same name located to the west of the station.

On January 6, 2003, an incendiary device exploded near this station. In 2004, three people were injured when an incendiary bomb exploded aboard a bus on the Caracas trunk at Calle 47 Sur, near the station.

== Station services ==
=== Old trunk services ===
Services rendered until April 29, 2006
Kind	Routes	Frequency
Current	2 Portal Norte 3 Portal Norte	Every 3 minutes on average
Express	Expreso 40 Expreso 70 Expreso 90	Every 2 minutes on average
Express Dominical	Expreso Dominical 15 Expreso Dominical 25	Every 3 or 4 minutes on average

=== Main line service ===
Service as of April 29, 2006
Type	Northern Routes	Southern Routes
Local	3	3
Express Every day All day	B75 / D21	H21 / H75
Express Monday through Saturday; All day	C17 / D20	H17 / H20
Express Monday through Saturday; Morning rush	B71	

== See also ==
- Bogotá
- TransMilenio
- List of TransMilenio Stations
