= Consuelo (TransMilenio) =

Mass transit stop in Bogotá, Colombia

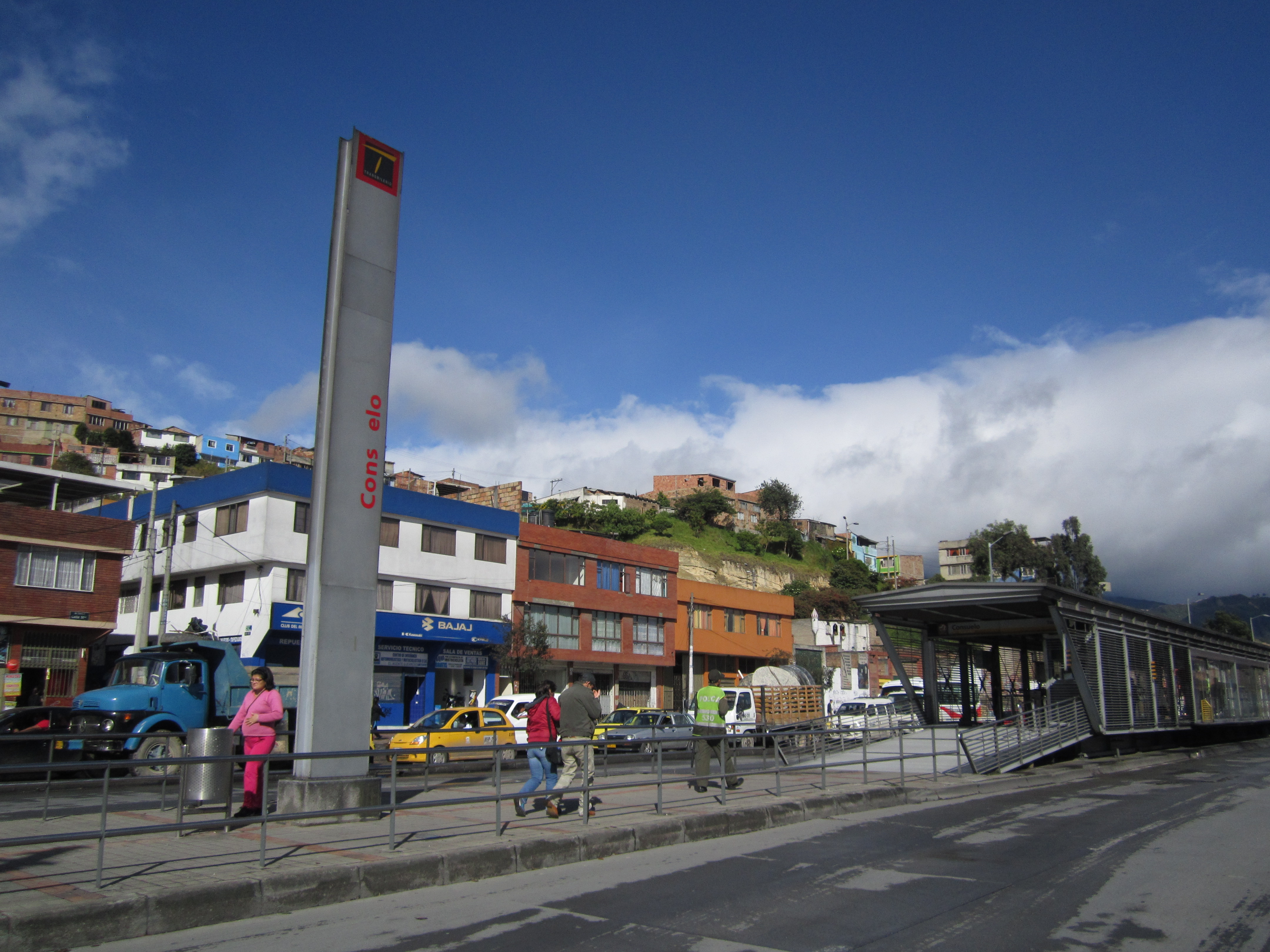

General information
- Location: Avenida Caracas with Carreras 11A and 12; Tunjuelito and Rafael Uribe Uribe neighborhood
- Line: Caracas Sur - Usme
- Platforms: 2

History
- Opened: June 23, 2001

Services
Preceding station	TransMilenio	Following station
Socorro towards Tercer Milenio	H	Molinos towards Portal de Usme or Portal del Tunal
Location

The simple station Consuelo is part of the TransMilenio mass-transit system of Bogotá, Colombia, opened in the year 2000.

== Location ==
The station is located in southern Bogotá, specifically on Avenida Caracas with Carreras 11A and 12. It serves the El Consuelo and Tunjelito Centro neighborhoods.

== History ==
At the beginning of 2001, the second phase of the Caracas line of the system was opened from Tercer Milenio to the intermediate station Calle 40 Sur. A few months later, service was extended south to Portal de Usme.

The station is named Consuelo for the neighborhood located on its west side.

== Station services ==
=== Old trunk services ===
Services rendered until April 29, 2006
Kind	Routes	Frequency
Current	2 Portal Norte	Every 3 minutes on average

=== Current Trunk Services ===
Service as of April 29, 2006
Type	Northern Routes	Southern Routes
All days	3	3
Express Every day All day	B75	H75
Express Monday through Saturday; All day	C17	H17

=== Dual Service ===
Services rendered from February 21, 2015
Type	Routes to the North	Routes to the South
Express Monday to Sunday; All day	M83	H83

=== Feeder routes ===
This station does not have connections to feeder routes.

=== Inter-city service ===
This station does not have inter-city service.

== See also ==
- Bogotá
- TransMilenio
- List of TransMilenio Stations
