= North–South divide in Bogotá =

Informal division of Bogotá, Colombia

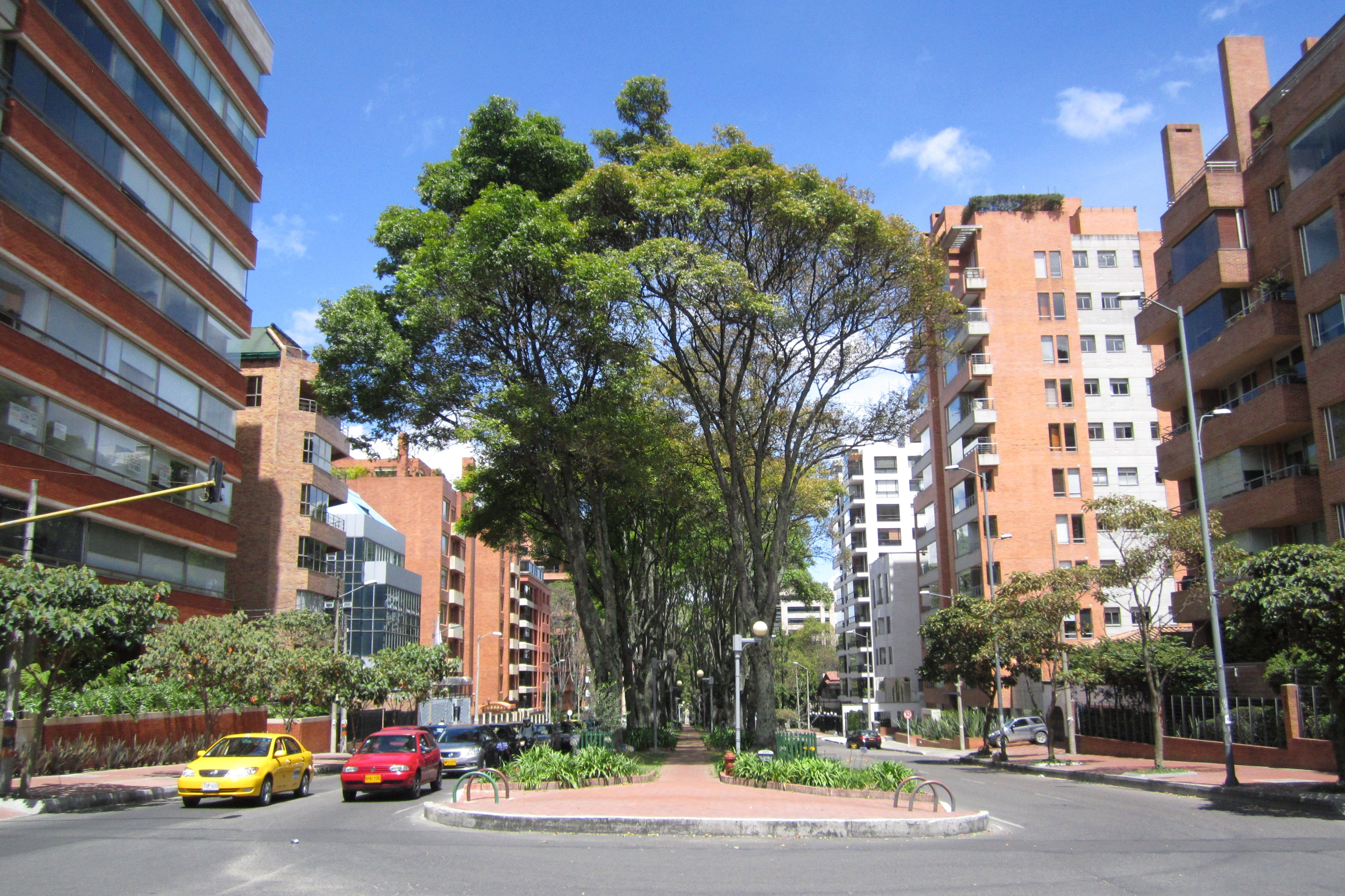
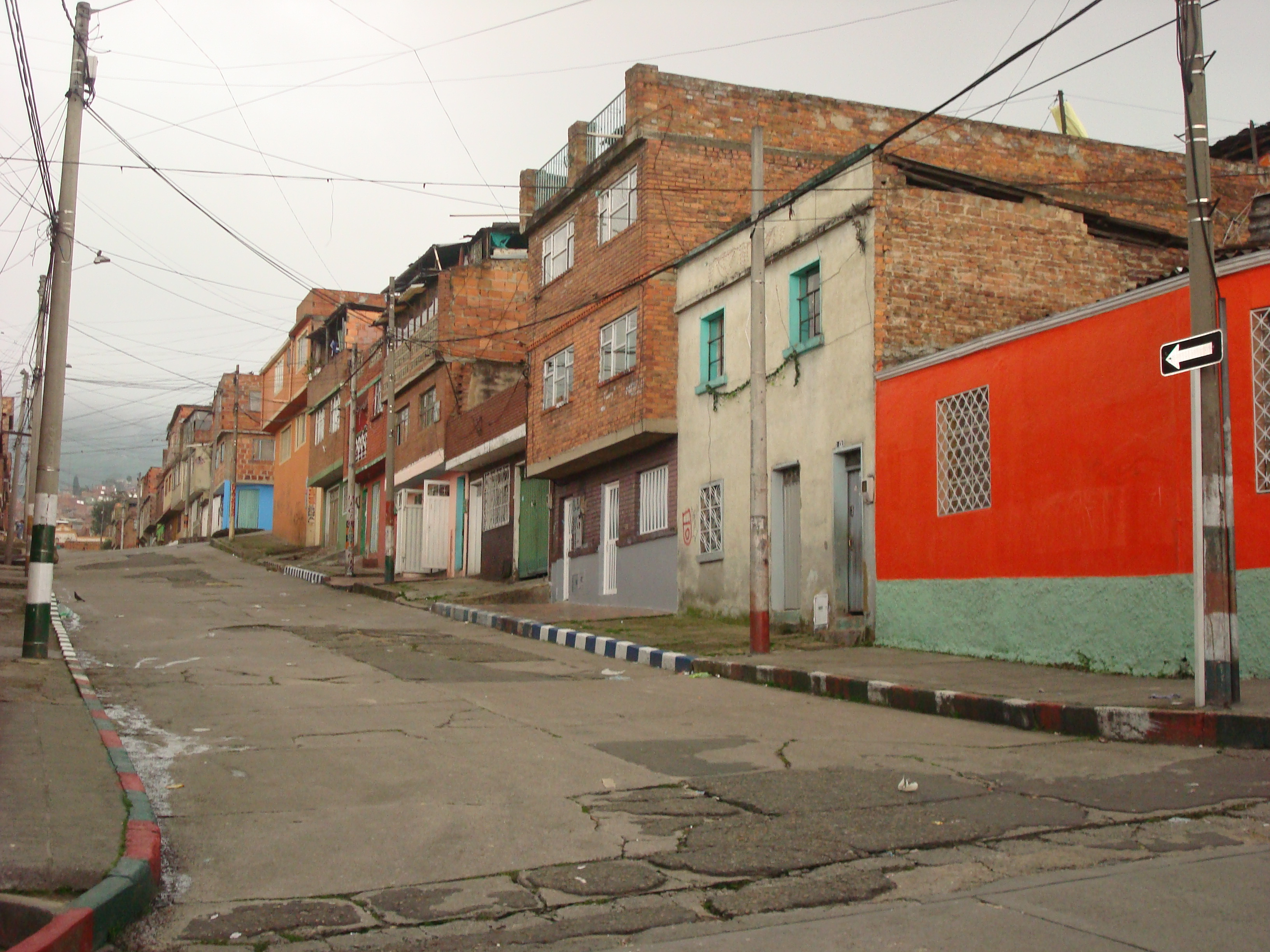
To the left, El Chicó neighborhood in Northern Bogotá; to the right, Córdoba (San Cristóbal) neighborhood in Southern Bogotá.

Bogotá, the capital city of Colombia, is informally divided between a northern region and a southern region. Neither region is well defined geographically, but the north is usually thought of as the wealthier, safer part of the city, whereas the south is usually thought of as the poorer, more dangerous part.

== Limits ==
Wikivoyage's division of Bogotá

The geographic limits of neither Northern nor Southern Bogotá are well defined, and where the limit is at depends on who is asked and where they live within the city.

The city government itself gives several definitions of what constitutes "North" and "South".

When dividing the city by exclusively its roads, the city government defines the North as starting in Calle 68 (Note: locally [ˈkad͡ʒe seˌsentai̯ˈot͡ʃo], '68th Street') and the south as starting in Calle 1 Sur. (Note: locally [ˈkad͡ʒe pɾiˈmeɾa suɾ], '1st South Street') It also defines the city center or east as between Calle 34 (Note: locally [ˈkad͡ʒe trei̯ntai̯ˈkwatɾo], '34th Street') (north), Calle 5 (Note: locally [ˈkad͡ʒe ˈkinta], '5th Street') (south), Carrera 1 (Note: Latin American Spanish pronunciation: [kaˈreɾa pɾiˈmeɾa], '1st Carrera') (east) and Avenida Caracas (Note: Latin American Spanish pronunciation: [aβeˈniða kaˈɾakas], 'Caracas Avenue') (west). The west is mentioned but is not defined in concrete terms.

Divided by its Local Planning Units (Note: Unidades de Planeamiento Local; Latin American Spanish pronunciation: [uniˈðaðes ðe planeaˈmjento loˈkal]) (UPLs), the city is divided in North, Northwest, West, Southwest, South and Greater Center, plus a category for the Capital District's rural areas. Keep in mind that, in Bogotá, "city center" does not usually refer to the geographically central part of Bogotá, but to the oldest part of the city, located in what is now its east.

Bogotá Cómo Vamos, a Bogotá-based think tank, defines Northern Bogotá as comprised by Usaquén, Chapinero and Suba.

Below is each locality of the city listed by how different sources locate it. Note that, with the exception of Sumapaz (where the map places the north at the top), the maps shown below place the north at the left and the east at the top.

Localities of Bogotá
N.	Map	Name	Location			
N.	Map	Name	City government			Wikivoyage
N.	Map	Name	By locality	By street layout	By UPL	Wikivoyage
1		Usaquén	Northeast end	North	North (Note: Urban area of the locality (roughly west of the Eastern Hills).); Rural (elsewhere)	
2		Chapinero	Center-east	North (Note: North of Calle 68.)	Greater Center; Rural (elsewhere)	Northeast
3		Santa Fe	City center	Center/East (Note: West of the locality, bordered by Carrera 1 to the east, Calle 34 to the north and Calle 5 to the south.)	Greater Center; Rural (elsewhere)	Downtown
4		San Cristóbal	Southeast	South	South; Rural (elsewhere)	South
5		Usme		South	South (Note: Main urban area of the locality (located in its north).); Rural (elsewhere)	South
6		Tunjuelito		South	South	South
7		Bosa	Southwest end	South	Southwest	West
8		Kennedy	Southwest	South (Note: South of Calle 1 Sur.)	Southwest	West
9		Fontibón			West	West
10		Engativá	Northwest	North	West	West
11		Suba	Northwest	North	Northwest (Note: Southwest of the locality, roughly west of the Hills of Suba and south of La Conejera wetland.); North (elsewhere)	Northwest
12		Barrios Unidos	Northwest	North	Greater Center	Northwest
13		Teusaquillo	Geographic centrer		Greater Center	Geographic centrer
14		Los Mártires	City center		Greater Center	Downtown
15		Antonio Nariño	Southeast	South	Greater Center	South
16		Puente Aranda		South	Greater Center	West
17		La Candelaria	Center-east	Center/East	Greater Center	Historic center
18		Rafael Uribe Uribe	Southeast	South	South	South
19		Ciudad Bolívar	South	South	South; Rural (elsewhere)	South
20		Sumapaz			Rural	South

== History ==
=== Early years ===
What is now the Southwest and Soacha was a land filled with fertile soil ideal for agriculture, which led to indigenous people living up until then in what would become the North to be displaced south by the Spanish during the late colonial period. What is now the Southeast was a land filled with primary resources, of which their extraction led to severe ecological damage.

By contrast, what is now the North was a land with poor quality soil used by the Spanish to raise livestock, particularly cows, which led to the North being imagined as "peaceful", "free from Indians" by the Spanish.

Starting in the late 19th century, due to the fact indigenous people started moving into Santafé (now Bogotá's historic center) after being displaced from their lands, the city's elites started to abandon Santafé and move west and north. Chapinero, which used to be a satellite settlement north of Santafé, became part of the city proper through this process, being officially integrated in 1914. This process of annexation by Bogotá would repeat itself in the rest of what is now the city.

=== City expansion ===
The northward emigration of wealthy Bogotans, added with the dismantling of Paseo Bolívar (a belt of working-class neighborhoods east of Santafé) between 1919 and the 1930s, indirectly kickstarted the expansion of the city southward, as a desire to keep poor people out of Santafé was coupled with a marginalization of the South, exemplified by how hospitals were placed southward out of fear diseases would spread from them, as well as overall neglect from the city government for southern settlements.

Transportation outside Santafé prioritized Chapinero and other northern settlements over southern ones. By the time a southward road was constructed (an extension of Avenida Caracas to Usme in 1938), Chapinero already had a consolidated a network of roads and railways. In general, infrastructure improving quality of life has generally been prioritized in the North, while the South has been treated mainly as a place for extraction of primary resources (as evidenced by the Vitelma water treatment plant in San Cristóbal Sur, which initially served exclusively northerners and was informally perforated by southerners in order to have access to clean water) and waste disposal (as evidenced by the Doña Juana landfill opened in the late 1980s and its devastating environmental impact).

While during the first half of the 20th century Bogotá saw explosive urban growth, such growth paled in comparison to the growth the city experimented in the mid 20th century, when the population of the city grew by over 2 million. This growth was largely out of the control of the city government, with many of the neighborhoods created during this expansion doing so informally ever away from Santafé and primarily (though not exclusively) in the South.

This urbanization process also forced the city government to expand the urban limits of the city (beyond which urban public services are not provided) by annexing 6 now former municipalities of Cundinamarca (Usaquén, Usme, Bosa, Fontibón, Engativá and Suba) to the formal limits of possible urban expansion. In the late 20th and early 21st centuries, the city grew out of the limits of the Capital District, and urban developments started taking place in neighboring Cundinamarca municipalities, most notably Soacha, which has seen the process of informal urbanization commonplace in neighboring Southern Bogotá repeat in its territory.

== Manifestations of the divide ==
=== Socio-economic ===
City governments in Colombia, including Bogotá's, have classified different sectors of their cities in different socioeconomic strata since the 1980s, with the 6th stratum being the highest and the 1st one being the lowest. Higher-stratum areas in Bogotá specifically are concentrated in the North, middle-stratum areas in the city center and the West, and lower-stratum areas in the West and South.

=== Political ===
North-up map of the Capital District in the 2011 mayoral election. In purple, the localities that voted for winner Gustavo Petro; in green, the localities that voted for Enrique Peñalosa.

In mayoral elections, turnout tends to be larger in the North and the West of Bogotá than it is in the South and the city center. In 1988, during the city's first mayoral election, northern localities had on average higher electoral turnout rates (near 70% turnout) than southern and city-center ones did (less than 60% turnout). This reality has partially changed, as electoral turnout in the 2010s was lower throughout the city (55% in the city overall), was higher in western localities (namely Fontibón, Engativá and Suba, which had turnout rates of 63% each in the 2019 mayoral election) and decreased significantly in Chapinero (52% turnout in the 2019 election, compared to the 69,7% in the 1988 election).

During the later years of the two-party system in Colombia, candidates from neither the Liberal nor the Conservative parties were relatively more electorally successful in the South and the city center, where they amassed more than a quarter of votes in localities like Bosa in the 1988 local election, for example. New Liberalism, a party that split off the Liberals in the 1980s, was the exception to this phenomenon, as the language of its campaign appealed to the higher-income individuals of the North more that it did to the working class of the South, the latter which was more likely to back the old-school Liberals.

In the 2010s, with Colombia having shifted from a two-party system to a multi-party one, the division changed to one where right-wing candidates are more popular in the North, centrist candidates are more popular in the West, and left-wing candidates are more popular in the South, particularly in the localities of San Cristóbal, Usme, Bosa and Ciudad Bolívar, which together represent around 30-35% of the city's population and have been nicknamed "the half-moon of the South" due to the fact left-wing candidates win in them most of the time.

== See also ==
- North–South divide
- Yamanote and Shitamachi, a similar west–east divide in Tokyo, Japan
