= Danubio (station) =

General information
- Location: Av. Calle 51 Sur between Carrera 5 and Calle 56 Sur. Usme neighborhood
- Line: Caracas Sur - Usme
- Platforms: 1

History
- Opened: November 2, 2024

Services
Preceding station	TransMilenio	Following station
Molinos towards Tercer Milenio	H	Portal de Usme towards Portal de Usme or Portal del Tunal
Location

The simple Danubio station is part of Bogotá's mass transit system, TransMilenio, inaugurated in 2000.

== Location ==
The station is located specifically on Caracas Avenue between 55th and 56th streets south, south of the La Picota national penitentiary and the Usme artillery battalion.

== Origin of the name ==
The station is named in direct reference to the neighborhood of the same name, close to the station. It serves the demand of this neighborhood, La Fiscala, Palermo Sur, La Vega del Bosque, La Paz and Picota Sur.

== History ==
Since the start of operation of the Caracas Sur Trunk in 2001, the stretch between Molinos Station and Portal Usme lacked exclusive lanes in its road section (approximately 2.8 km). This situation, over time, affected the operation in terms of speed and generated high accident rates, mainly due to the increase in mixed traffic on the corridor in recent years, as it only has two lanes in each direction.

With the aim of improving mobility in this section, since 2006, the IDU had final designs completed, contracted and carried out with resources from the Nation-District Agreement for the expansion of the Caracas Trunk. This project included the addition of four new exclusive lanes and another four mixed lanes in each direction, the construction of a new feeder station in Molinos and a new station at the height of Calle 56 Sur (Danubio), in addition to a bicycle path and the adaptation of public space. Finally, the works were awarded in 2019 and began in 2021.

The work took longer than expected due to several problems, such as the logistics of purchasing land and archaeological discoveries during excavations. These delays led to protests from the community due to late delivery times. The station finally became operational on November 2, 2024.

== Station services ==
=== Core services ===
Services provided as of 2 November 2024
Type	Northbound Routes	Soutbound Routes
Express every day all day	B75 K54 M83	H54 H75 H83
Express Monday–Friday all day	C17	H17
Express Monday–Friday morning rush hour	J76	
Express Monday–Friday evening rush hour		H76

=== Map ===
← North
Carrera 5D	B75K54	C17J76M83	Carrera 5A
	Car 2	Car 1	
Carrera 5D	H75H76H83	H17H54	Carrera 5A
South →

=== Urban services ===
The following urban routes also operate in the same way SITP on the external sides of the station, circulating on the mixed traffic lanes on the Avenida Caracas, with the possibility of transfer using the tarjeta TuLlave:

SITP stops
Code	Sector	Address	Routes
007A12	H Artillery School No. 13	Av. Caracas - TV 5D	A702A706A708A720B907G530H622H726H728K700K715K721L723 953 E44
040A11	H Artillery School No. 13	Av. Caracas - TV 5D	H530H622H700H702H706H708H715H720H721H723H726H728H907 953 E44

== See also ==
- Bogotá
- TransMilenio
- List of TransMilenio Stations
