= Hospital (TransMilenio) =

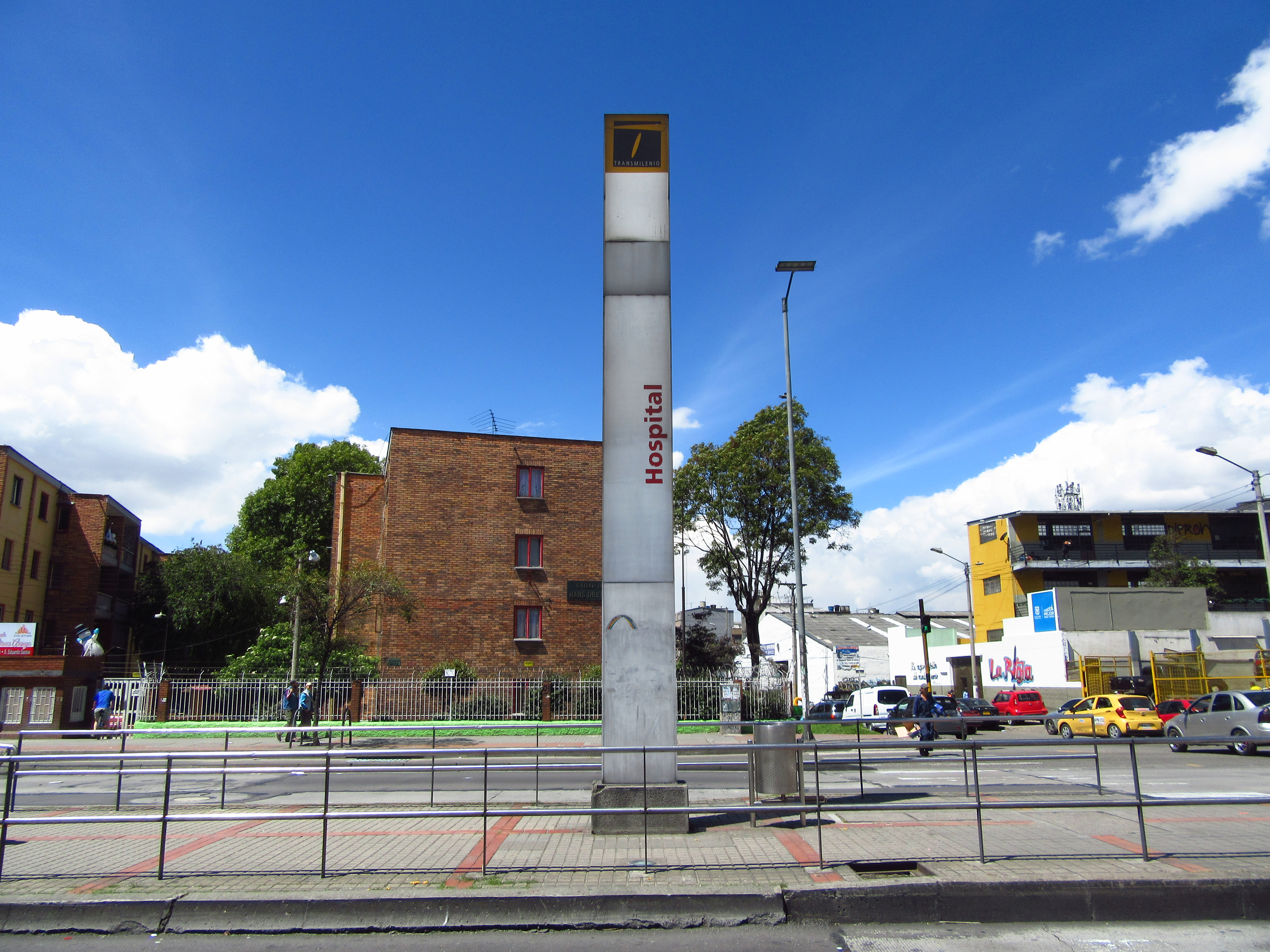

General information
- Location: Avenida Caracas with calles 3 y 4 Los Mártires and Santa Fe
- Line: Caracas Sur
- Platforms: 2

History
- Opened: April 8, 2001

Services
Preceding station	TransMilenio	Following station
Tercer Milenio Terminus	H	Hortúa towards Portal de Usme or Portal del Tunal
Location

The simple-station Hospital is part of the TransMilenio mass-transit system of Bogotá, Colombia, opened in the year 2000.

== Location ==
The station is located in the city center, specifically at Avenida Caracas with Calles 3 and 4.

== History ==
At the beginning of 2001, the second phase of the Caracas trunk was opened from Tercer Milenio to Calle 40 Sur. A few months later, service was extended south to Portal de Usme.

The station received the name Hospital for its proximity to the five medical centers (San Juan de Dios, Santa Clara, La Misericordia, Materno Infantil, and La Samaritana) that are better known as Ciudad Salud, or Health City.

== Station Services ==
=== Old trunk services ===
Services rendered until April 29, 2006
Kind	Routes	Frequency
Current	2 Portal Norte 3 Portal Norte	Every 3 minutes on average

=== Current Trunk Services ===
Service as of April 29, 2006
Type	Northern Routes	Southern Routes
All days	3	3
Express Monday through saturday all day	B72	H72

=== Feeder routes ===
This station does not have connections to feeder routes.

=== Inter-city service ===
This station does not have inter-city service.

== See also ==
- Bogotá
- TransMilenio
- List of TransMilenio Stations
