= Restrepo (TransMilenio) =

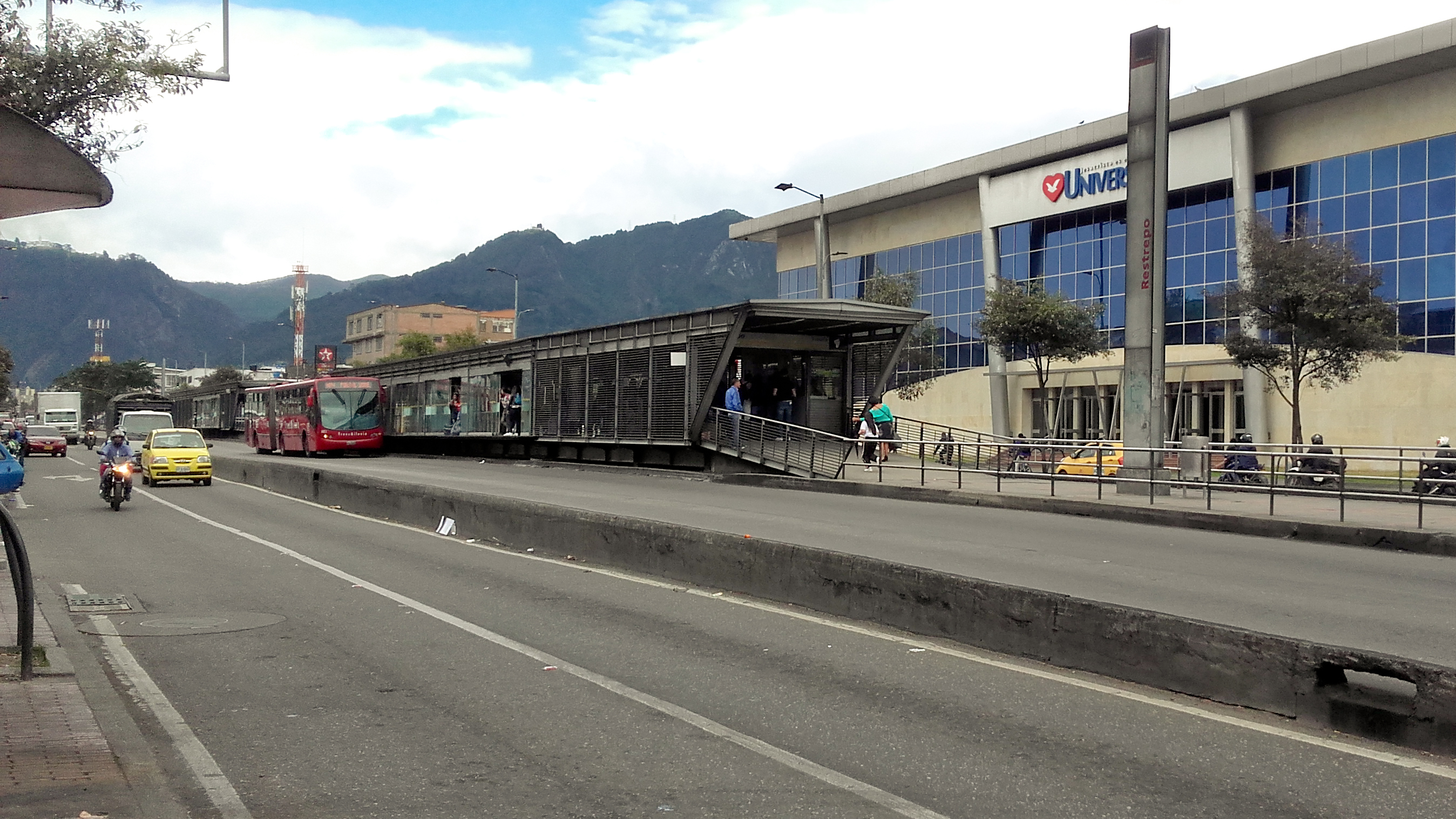

General information
- Location: Avenida Caracas with Calles 19 and 22 Sur (Avenida Primero de Mayo); Antonio Nariño
- Line: Caracas Sur
- Platforms: 2

History
- Opened: April 8, 2001

Services
Preceding station	TransMilenio	Following station
Fucha towards Tercer Milenio	H	Olaya towards Portal de Usme or Portal del Tunal
Location

Restrepo is a station that is a part of the TransMilenio mass-transit system of Bogotá, Colombia. It was opened in the 2000.

== Location ==
The station is located in southern Bogotá, specifically on Avenida Caracas with Calles 19 and 22 sur.

It serves the Olaya, San José, and Ciudad Jardín Sur neighborhoods.

== History ==
At the beginning of 2001, the second phase of the Caracas line of the system was opened from Tercer Milenio to the intermediate station Calle 40 Sur. A few months later, service was extended south to Portal de Usme.

The station is named Restrepo due to its proximity to an area of that name located to the west of the station.

== Station Services ==
=== Old trunk services ===
Services rendered until April 29, 2006
Kind	Routes	Frequency
Current	2 Portal Norte 3 Portal Norte	Every 3 minutes on average
Express	Expreso 40 Expreso 50 Expreso 60 Expreso 90	Every 2 minutes on average
Express Dominical	Expreso Dominical 15 Expreso Dominical 25	Every 3 or 4 minutes on average

=== Main line service ===
Service as of April 29, 2006
Type	Northern Routes	Southern Routes
Local	3	3
Express Every day All day	B75	H75
Express Monday through Saturday; All day	B13 / C17 / K54	H13 / H17 / H54
Express Monday through Saturday; Morning rush	B71	

=== Feeder Service ===
There is no feeder service here.

=== Inter-City Service ===
There is no Inter-City service.

== See also ==
- Bogotá
- TransMilenio
- List of TransMilenio stations
