= Restrepo =

Restrepo may refer to:

== Places ==
- Restrepo, Bogotá, Colombia
  - Restrepo (TransMilenio)
- Restrepo, Meta, Colombia
- Restrepo, Valle del Cauca, Colombia
- Restrepo (Vegadeo), a village in Vegadeo, Spain

== Other uses ==
- Restrepo (film), a 2010 American war documentary
- Restrepo (name), a surname
