= Alcalá (TransMilenio) =

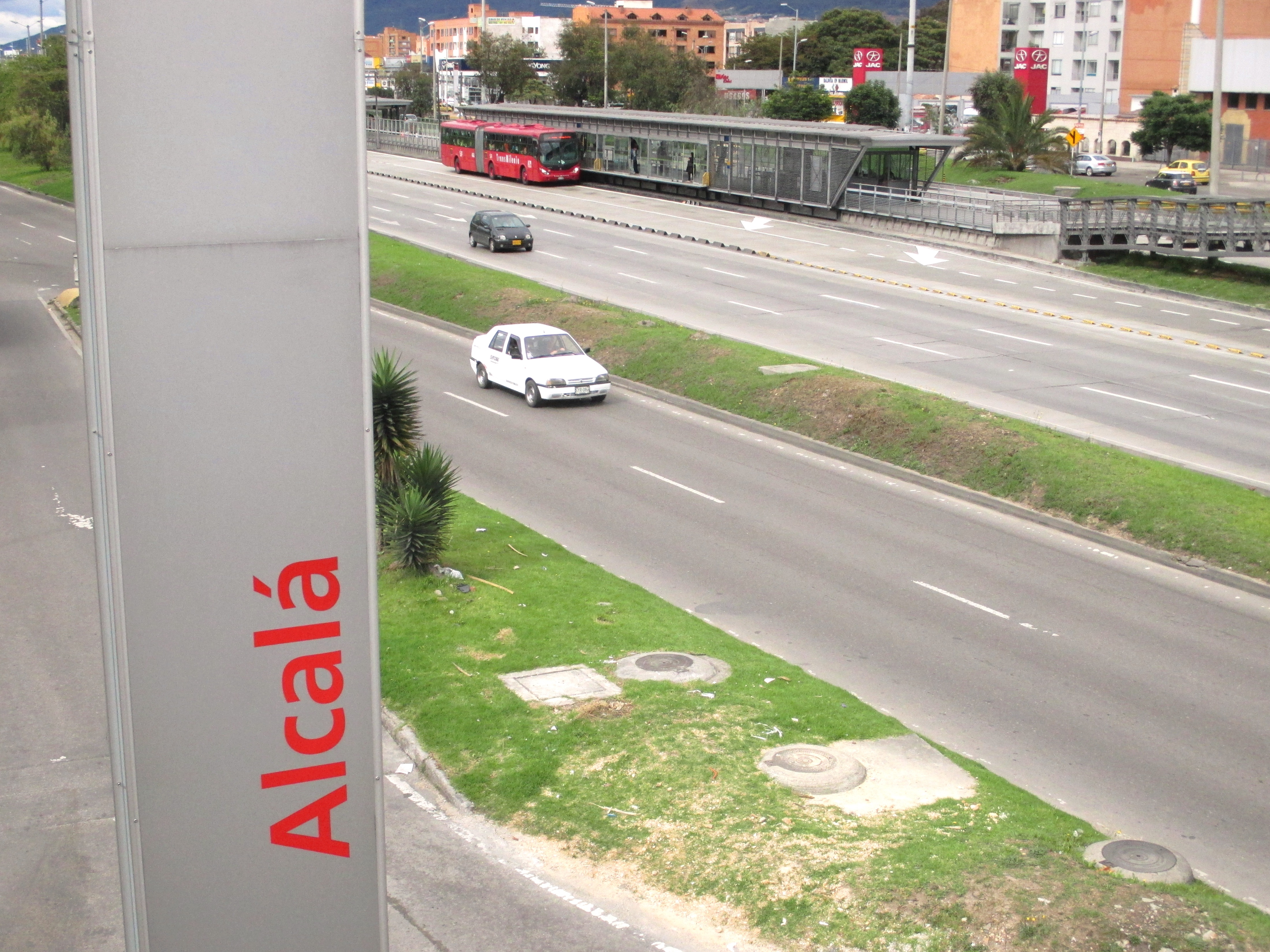

General information
- Location: Autopista Norte with Calle 136; Usaquén and Suba, Bogotá; Colombia

History
- Opened: 2001

Services
Preceding station	TransMilenio	Following station
Calle 142 towards Terminal	B	Prado towards Héroes
Location

Alcalá is a simple station that is part of the TransMilenio mass-transit system of Bogotá, Colombia.

== Location ==
The station is located in northern Bogotá, specifically on Autopista Norte with Calle 136.

It serves the Los Cedros and San José del Prado neighborhoods.

== History ==
After the opening of the Portal de Usme in early 2001, the Autopista Norte line was opened. This station was added as a northerly expansion of that line, which was completed with the opening of the Portal del Norte later that year.

The station is named Alcalá due to its proximity to the neighborhood of the same name.

This station has a "Punto de Encuentro" or point of gathering, which has bathrooms, coffeeshop, parking for bicycles and a tourist attention booth.

== See also ==
- List of TransMilenio Stations
