= Restrepo (name) =

Restrepo is a surname. Notable people with the surname include:

- Andrew Restrepo (born 1970), American soccer player
- Camilo Torres Restrepo (1929–1966), Colombian socialist, priest, academic and guerilla
- Carla Restrepo, Colombian biologist and academic
- Carlos Restrepo (disambiguation), multiple people
- Daniel Restrepo (born 2000), Colombian diver
- Diego Restrepo (born 1988), American soccer player
- Eduardo Restrepo Sáenz (1886–1955), Colombian lawyer, historian, diplomat and politician
- Eduardo Restrepo Victoria (born 1958), Colombian drug trafficker
- Fabio Ochoa Restrepo (1923–2002), Colombian drug trafficker
- Felipe Restrepo Pombo, Colombian journalist and writer
- Félix Restrepo Mejía (1887–1965), Colombian priest, writer, pedagogue, classical scholar and humanist
- Gustavo Restrepo (race walker) (born 1982), Colombian race walker
- Gustavo Restrepo (footballer) (born 1969), Colombian footballer
- Griselda Blanco Restrepo (1943–2012), Colombian drug trafficker
- Hugo Restrepo (born 1950), Colombian film producer, cultural critic and writer
- Jhonatan Restrepo (born 1994), Colombian cyclist
- John Restrepo (born 1977), Colombian footballer
- José Restrepo (wrestler) (born 1974), Colombian wrestler
- José Manuel Restrepo Abondano (born 1969), Colombian academic, economist, journalist and politician
- José Manuel Restrepo Vélez (1781–1863), Colombian botanist, politician and historian
- José Reynal-Restrepo (1977–2011) Colombian priest, anti-mining activist and murder victim
- Juan Camilo Restrepo Salazar (born 1946), Colombian politician and diplomat
- Juan David Restrepo (born 1979), Colombian actor and film director
- Juan Sebastián Restrepo (born 1986), American soldier and medic who was the subject of the documentary film Restrepo
- Juana Acosta Restrepo (born 1976), Colombian actress
- Julieth Restrepo (born 1986), Colombian model and actress
- Laura Restrepo (born 1950), Colombian writer
- Luis Carlos Restrepo (born 1954), Colombian psychiatrist, philosopher and diplomat
- L. Felipe Restrepo (born 1959), American judge and lawyer
- Marcela Restrepo (born 1995), Colombian footballer
- Marco Restrepo (born 1989), American musician, songwriter and producer
- Marcos Restrepo (born 1961), Ecuadorian painter
- Mateo Restrepo (born 1997), Canadian soccer player
- Nicanor Restrepo Giraldo (1871–1938), Colombian businessman and politician
- Nixon Restrepo (born 1993), Colombian footballer
- Pablo Restrepo (born 1960), Colombian swimmer
- Pedro Restrepo (1920–2012), Colombian artist, civil servant, art historian and writer
- Rocio Restrepo (born 1987), Colombian bowler
- Vanesa Restrepo (born 1987), Colombian actress and model
- Wálter Restrepo (born 1988), American soccer player
- Xavier Restrepo (born 2002), American football player
- Ximena Restrepo (born 1969), Colombian sprinter

== Fictional characters ==
- Cataleya Restrepo, a character in the 2011 film Colombiana played by Amandla Stenberg
- Fabio Restrepo, Cataleya's father in Colombiana played by Jesse Borrego
