= Prado (TransMilenio) =

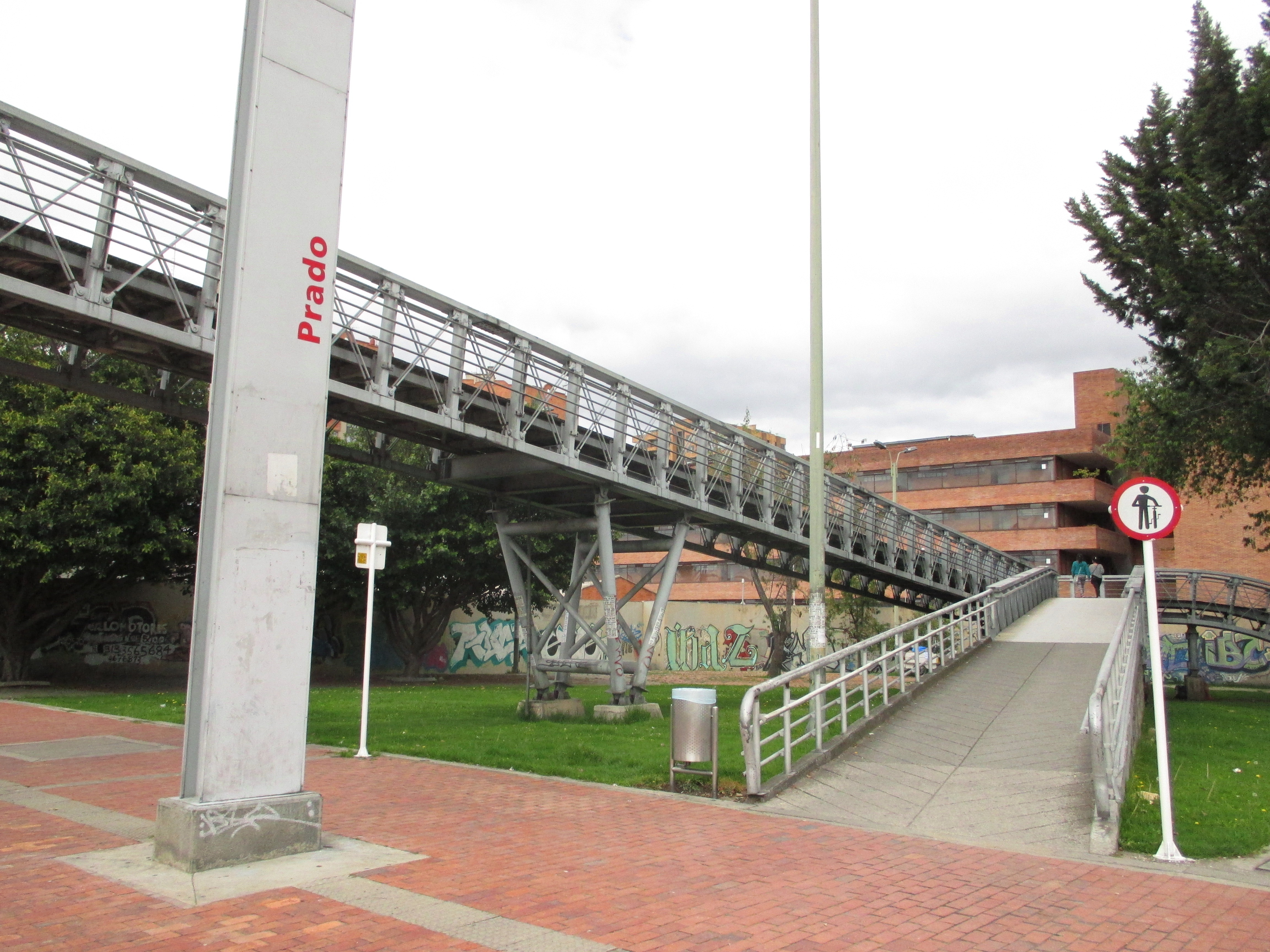

General information
- Location: Usaquén and Suba (Bogotá); Colombia

History
- Opened: 2001

Services
Preceding station	TransMilenio	Following station
Alcalá towards Terminal	B	Calle 127 towards Héroes
Location

The simple station Prado is part of the TransMilenio mass-transit system of Bogotá, Colombia, which opened in the year 2000.

== Location ==
The station is located in northern Bogotá, specifically on Autopista Norte with Calle 128 B.

It serves the Prado Varaniego, La Calleja and Canódromo neighborhoods.

== History ==
After the opening of the Portal de Usme in early 2001, the Autopista Norte line was opened. This station was added as a northerly expansion of that line, which was completed with the opening of the Portal del Norte later that year.

The station is named Prado due to its proximity to the Prado Veraniego neighborhood of Suba.

At the west side of the station there is a Home Sentry supercenter.

== Station services ==
=== Old trunk services ===
Services rendered until April 29, 2006
Kind	Routes	Frequency
Current		Every 3 minutes on average
Express	Expreso 70 Expreso 130	Every 2 minutes on average
Super Express	Expreso 400	Every 2 minutes on average

=== Main line service ===
Service as of April 29, 2006
Type	Northwards	Southwards	Frequency
Local	8	8	Every three minutes
Express Monday through Saturday; All day	B12 / B23 / B73	G12 / K23 / H74	Every two minutes
Express Monday through Friday; Morning rush		H73	Every two minutes
Express Monday through Saturday; Morning rush	B71	J70 / A74	Every two minutes
Express Monday through Saturday; Mixed service, rush and non-rush	B28	F28	Every two minutes
Express Monday through Friday; Mixed service, rush and non-rush	B74	J72	Every two minutes
Express Sunday and holidays	B90	G90	Every 3–4 minutes

=== Feeder routes ===
This station does not have connections to feeder routes.

=== Inter-city service ===
This station does not have inter-city service.

== See also ==
- Bogotá
- TransMilenio
- List of TransMilenio Stations
