= Calle 142 (TransMilenio) =

Bus station in Bogotá, Colombia

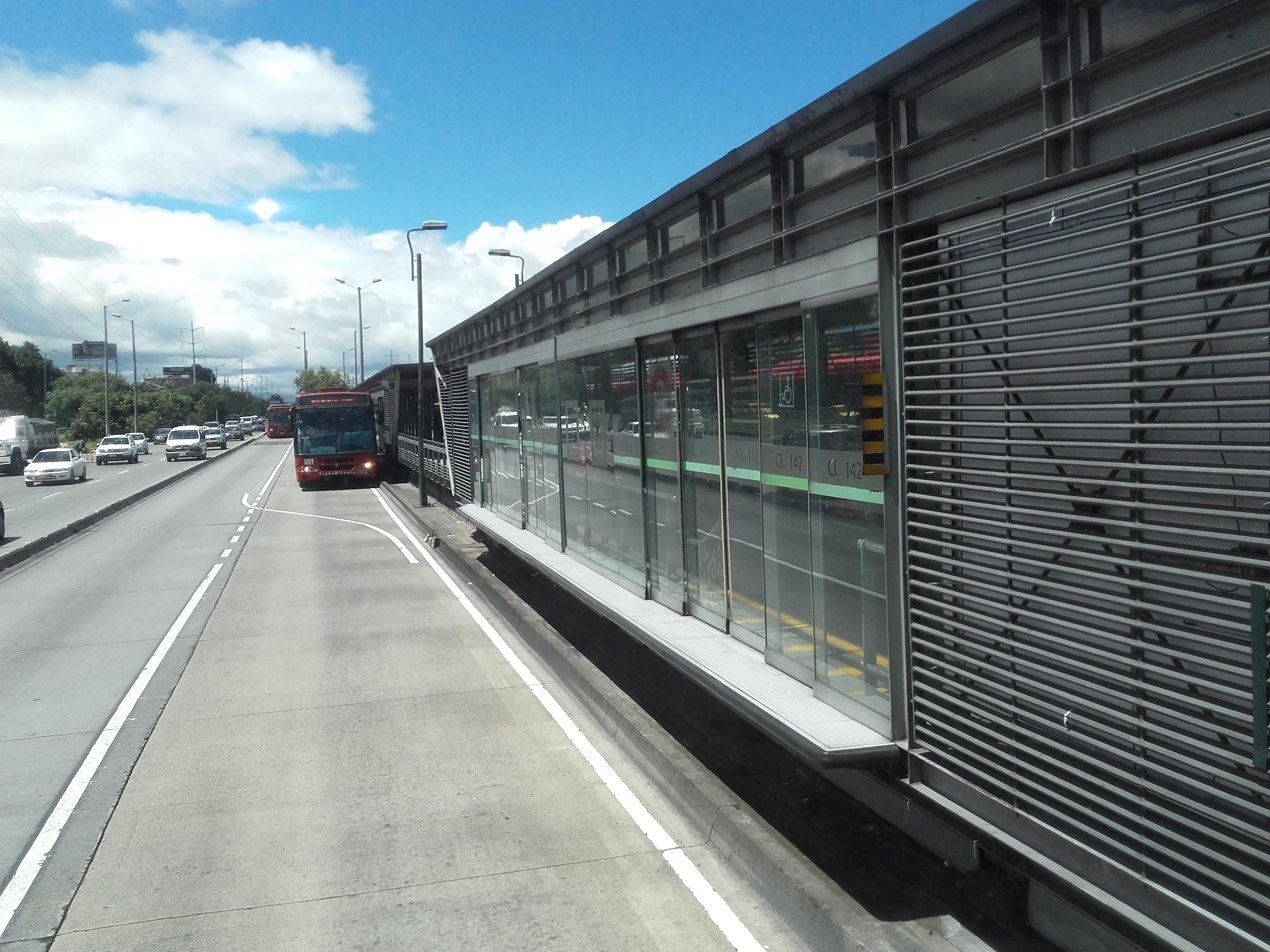

General information
- Location: Usaquén and Suba (Bogotá); Colombia

History
- Opened: 2001

Services
Preceding station	TransMilenio	Following station
Calle 146 towards Terminal	B	Alcalá towards Héroes
Location

The simple station Calle 142 is part of the TransMilenio mass-transit system of Bogotá, Colombia, which opened in 2000.

== Location ==
The station is located in northern Bogotá, specifically on Autopista Norte with Calle 144.

It serves the Los Cedros and Prado Pinzón neighborhoods.

== History ==
After the opening of the Portal de Usme in early 2001, the Autopista Norte line was opened. This station was added as a northerly expansion of that line, which was completed with the opening of the Portal del Norte later that year.

The station is named Calle 142 due to its location near that road, though it serves the Cedritos area.

On March 7, 2011, an articulated bus crashed into one of their wagons. Ten people were injured and the station suffered damage.

== Station services ==
=== Old trunk services ===
Services rendered until April 29, 2006
Kind	Routes	Frequency
Current		Every 3 minutes on average
Express	Expreso 50 Expreso 130	Every 2 minutes on average
Super Express	Expreso 400	Every 2 minutes on average

=== Main line service ===
Service as of April 29, 2006
Type	Northwards	Southwards	Frequency
Local	8	8	Every three minutes
Express Monday through Saturday; All day	B12 / B13 / B73	G12 / H13 / H74	Every two minutes
Express Monday through Friday; Morning rush		J70 / A74	Every two minutes
Express Monday through Saturday; Mixed service, rush and non-rush	B74	J72	Every two minutes
Express Monday through Friday; Mixed service, rush and non-rush	B50	C61	Every two minutes
Express Sunday and holidays	B92	H92	Every 3–4 minutes

=== Feeder routes ===
This station does not have connections to feeder routes.

=== Inter-city service ===
This station does not have inter-city service.

== See also ==
- Bogotá
- TransMilenio
- List of TransMilenio Stations
