= Rafael Uribe Uribe, Bogotá =

Rafael Uribe Uribe
- Locality of Bogotá
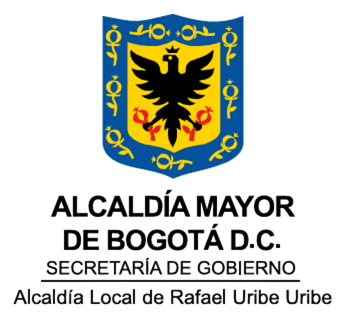
- Coat of arms

- Location of the locality in the city of Bogotá

- Location of the locality in the Capital District of Bogotá
- Coordinates: 4°34′47″N 74°07′03″W
- Country: Colombia
- City: Bogotá D.C.
- Neighbourhoods: List: Quiroga (Bogotá)

Area
  - Total: 13.83 km^{2} (5.34 sq mi)
- Elevation: 2,600 m (8,500 ft)

Population (2007)
  - Total: 378,780
  - Density: 27,390/km^{2} (70,940/sq mi)
- Time zone: UTC-5 (Colombia Standard Time)
- Website: Official website

Rafael Uribe Uribe is the 18th locality of the Capital District in the Colombian capital Bogotá. This district is mostly inhabited by working and lower class residents. It was named after the Liberal General Rafael Uribe Uribe. Historically, it has been a predominantly residential area with minor commercial activity. Since the 1940s, urban expansion began from the flat Bogotá savanna towards higher elevations. Nowadays, the locality's southern part is undergoing urban expansion.

== Geography ==
The Rafael Uribe Uribe locality borders to the north with the Avenida Primero de Mayo and with the locality of Antonio Nariño, to the south with the streets Calle 46 Sur, Calle 47 Sur and Calle 54 Sur and the locality of Usme. To the east, the locality borders with Carrera 10 and the Chiguaza Creek separating it from the locality of San Cristóbal and to the west with the Avenida 27 Sur and Carrera 33 bordering with the locality of Tunjuelito.

== History ==
In 1991, the territory of Rafael Uribe Uribe became a locality and in 1993 the local city hall was constituted. On October 29, 2004, the Quiroga neighborhood was subject to a terrorist attack.

== Transport ==
Besides the routes covered by private bus companies, the locality is served by the mass-transit system TransMilenio with its H Line covering most of the area with the stations; Consuelo, Socorro, Santa Lucía, Calle 40 Sur, Quiroga and Olaya.

== Neighborhoods ==
La Picota (where there is a prison with the same name), Quiroga (where the local cityhall is), Diana Turbay, Molinos, Libertador, Olaya, Gustavo Restrepo, Santa Lucia, Inglés, La Resurrección, Sosiego, Claret, San Jorge, Marco Fidel Suarez, El Pesebre, Río de Janeiro, Las Colinas, Luis López de MMeza, Terrazas de San Jorge, Molinos Sur, Bochica, Marruecos, Socorro, Puerto Rico, Pijaos, Las Lomas, Mirador, Bosque de San Carlos and Country Sur, Los Pinos, Libertadores, Los Puentes, and others.
