= Carlos Restrepo =

Carlos Restrepo may refer to:

- Carlos Lleras Restrepo (1908–1994), President of Colombia
- Carlos Eugenio Restrepo (1867–1937), Colombian lawyer, writer and President of Colombia
- Carlos Restrepo (manager) (born 1961), football coach
