= Carla Restrepo =

Puerto Rican biologist

Carla Restrepo is a professor in the biology department of the University of Puerto Rico, Río Piedras Campus. Her research focuses on the study of tropical landscapes, including the processes underlying their large-scale dynamics.

== Education ==
Restrepo received her B.S. in biology at the University of Valle in Cali, Colombia, in 1984. In 1990, Restrepo received an M.S. in zoology at the University of Florida, where she also received her Ph.D. in 1995.

== Awards ==
Restrepo has received a number of prizes, honors, and grants in the course of her career.

- 1988: Jessie Smith Noyes Fellowship to attend Organization for Tropical Studies course
- 1989–1992: National Science Foundation Minority Graduate Fellowship
- 1990: Marcia Tucker Travel Award, American Ornithologists' Union, USA
- 1993: Graduate School Travel Award, University of Florida, FL
- 1995: Department of Zoology Travel Award, University of Florida, FL
- 1995: College of Liberal Arts and Sciences Dissertation Fellowship, University of Florida, FL
- 1996–1998: National Science Foundation Minority Postdoctoral Research Fellowship
- 2010: Elective Member of the American Ornithologist’s Union
- 2019: Fulbright scholarship

== Research ==
Her main areas of research are landscape ecology, ecosystems, landslides and their impact on ecosystem diversity, changes in land cover and carbon budgets, forest fragmentation and phenotypic plasticity, and seed dispersal in fragmented landscapes.

== Recent publications ==
- Sutton, L. and C. Restrepo. 2013. Natural disasters, diverse economy and livelihoods in the Sierra de Las Minas, Guatemala. Journal of Latin American Geography 12: 137-164.
- Delgado, D., A. Galindo, M.E. Perez, T. Giray, and C. Restrepo. 2012. Forecasting the influence of climate change on agroecosystem services: Impacts on honey yields in a small-island developing state. Psyche: A Journal of Entomology, doi:10.1155/2012/951215.
- Ramos-Scharron, C., E. Castellanos, and C. Restrepo. 2012. The role of shallow landslides in the downslope transfer of organic matter and its implications on the residence time of carbon in a tropical mountain system. Journal of Geophysical Research - Biogeosciences 117, G03016. doi:10.1029/2011JG001838
- Xu, L., T. Hanson, E. Bedrick, and C. Restrepo. 2010. Hypothesis tests on mixture model components with application to ecological and agricultural data. Journal of Agricultural, Biological, and Environmental Statistics 15:308–326. DOI: 10.1007/s13253-010-0020-z
- Restrepo, C., L. Walker, A. Shiels, R. Bussman, L. Claessens, S. Fisch, P. Lozano, G. Negi, L. Paolini, G. Poveda, C. Ramos-Scharron, M. Richter, E. Velazquez. 2009. Landsliding and its multi-scale influence on mountainscapes. BioScience 59:685-698.
- Restrepo, C. and N. Arango. 2008. Discontinuities in the Geographical Range Size of North American Birds and Butterflies: A Biogeographical Test of the Textural Discontinuity Hypothesis. Pages 101-135 in C. Allen, G. Peterson, and C. S. Holling (eds.). Cross-scale Structure and Discontinuities in Ecosystems and other Complex Systems. Columbia University Press, New York, New York, US.
- Delgado-Acevedo, J. and C. Restrepo. 2008. The effect of habitat loss on body size, allometry, and bilateral asymmetry in two Eleutherodactylus species of Puerto Rico. Conservation Biology 22:773-782 Doi: 10.1111/j.1523-1739.2008.00930.x
- Allen, A., B. T. Milne, W. Pockman, A. Tyler, and C. Restrepo. 2008. Allometry, growth, and population regulation of the desert shrub Larrea tridentata. Functional Ecology 22:197-204. DOI: 10.1111/j.1365- 2435.2007.01376.x
- Acevedo, M. and C. Restrepo. 2008. Land-use change and the large-scale organization of bird assemblages in the island of Puerto Rico. Diversity and Distributions 14:114-122.
- Cuervo, A. and C. Restrepo. 2007. Assemblage and population-level consequences of forest fragmentation on bilateral asymmetry in tropical montane birds. Biological Journal of the Linnean Society 92:119-133.
