= Antonio Nariño, Bogotá =

Antonio Nariño
- Locality of Bogotá
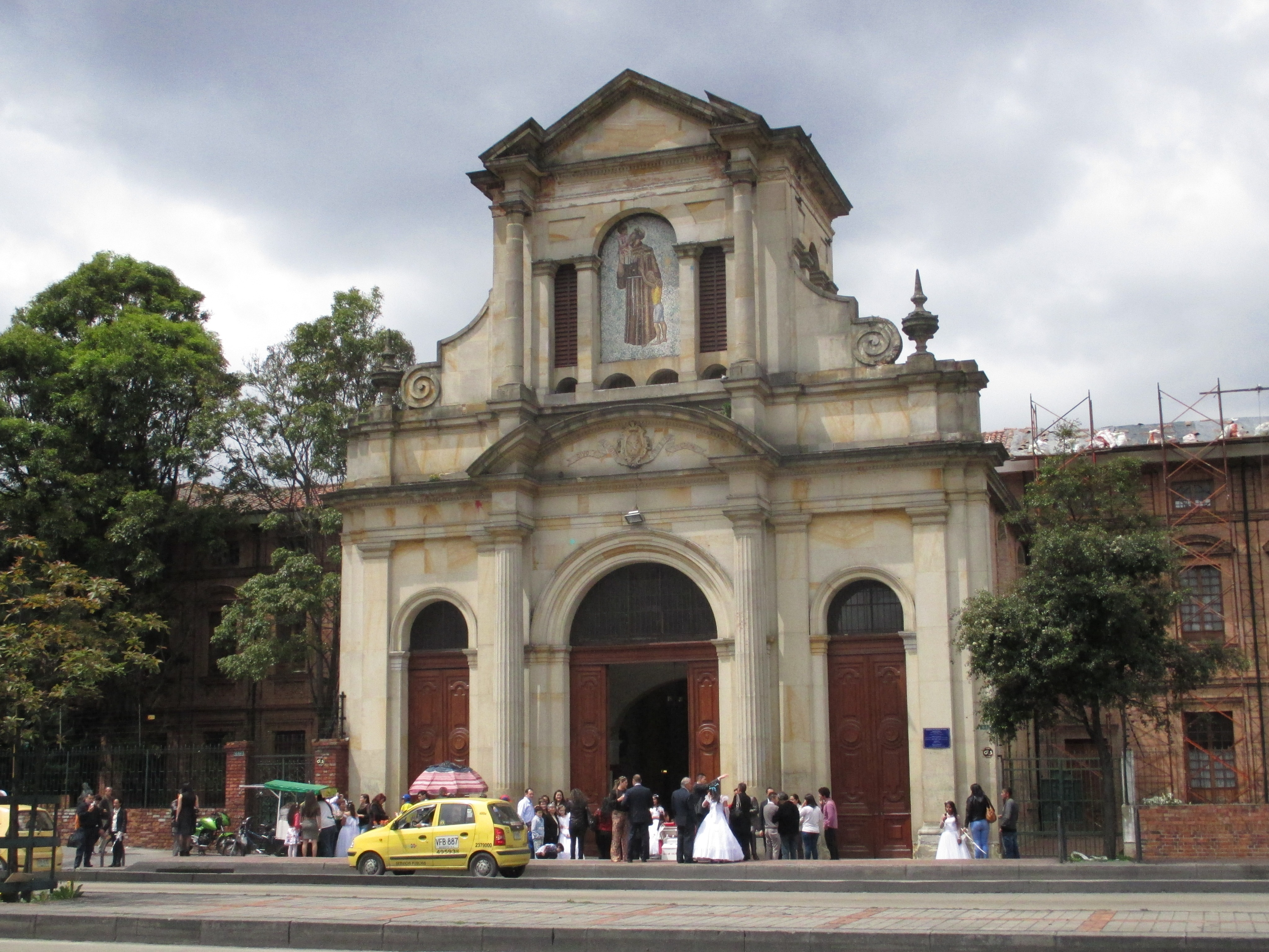
- San Antonio de Padua Church

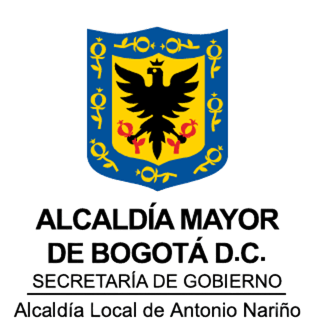
- Flag Coat of arms

- Location of the locality in the city of Bogotá

- Location of the locality in the Capital District of Bogotá
- Coordinates: 4°35′03″N 74°06′47″W
- Country: Colombia
- City: Bogotá D.C.
- Neighbourhoods: Restrepo (Bogotá)

Area
  - Total: 4.88 km^{2} (1.88 sq mi)
- Elevation: 2,600 m (8,500 ft)

Population (2007)
  - Total: 119,565
  - Density: 24,500/km^{2} (63,500/sq mi)
- Time zone: UTC-5 (Colombia Standard Time)
- Website: Official website

Antonio Nariño is the 15th locality of Bogotá, capital of Colombia. It is located in the central part of the city. This district is mostly inhabited by middle class residents. The locality is named after an early Colombian leader, Antonio Nariño, who is often referred to as the precursor to the presidency.

== General information ==
=== Borders ===
- North: Autopista Sur, Calle 8 Sur and Avenida Primera, with the localities of Puente Aranda and Los Mártires
- South: Avenida Primero de Mayo, with the locality of Rafael Uribe Uribe
- East: Carrera 10ª, with the locality of San Cristóbal
- West: Calle 44 Sur, with the locality of Tunjuelito

=== Hydrology ===
The locality had several rivers that have been transformed into canals flowing into the Fucha River. It has several parks. There is one major commercial sector in the Restrepo neighborhood, with the balance of the locality consisting of residential areas with small stores and churches.

=== Topography ===
The topography of the locality is mainly flat, as it is located on the Bogotá savanna.

=== Transportation ===
The mass transport system of Bogotá, TransMilenio, runs on Avenida Caracas (Restrepo and Fucha stations) and Autopista Sur. Other buses serve Avenida Primera, Primero de Mayo, and Carrera 10.

== History ==
During the 19th century, the territory belonged to the rule of Muequetá, as part of the Muisca Confederation. Large estates, located on the shores of the rivers that crossed it, were built by the Spanish after the conquest. The process of urbanization started in 1920, and was completed over the following 50 years. It was separated as a locality in 1991. The majority of the locality contains estrato 3 residential areas.

== Economy ==
The Restrepo area is located on Carrera 24 until the Avenida Primero de Mayo, which is the largest commercial area of the locality. A large number of small companies are located here, with the production of low-cost, high-quality shoes among the most notable of industries.

== Neighborhoods ==
Main neighborhoods are Restrepo, Policarpa Salavarrieta, Luna Park, Villa Mayor, Eduardo Freí, San Antonio, Caracas, Ciudad Berna, Ciudad Jardín, La Fragua, Eduardo Santos, and Santander.
