= Restrepo, Bogotá =

Restrepo
- Barrio
- Country: Colombia
- Department: Distrito Capital
- City: Bogotá

Restrepo is a neighbourhood (barrio) of Bogotá, Colombia. It is a commercial district.
