= Usme =

- Locality of Bogotá
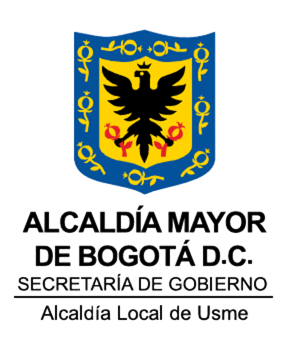
- Coat of arms

- Location of the locality in the city of Bogotá

- Location of the locality in the Capital District of Bogotá
- Coordinates: 4°26′47″N 74°09′08″W
- Country: Colombia
- City: Bogotá D.C.
- Founded: 1650
- Neighbourhoods: 126

Area
  - Total: 119.04 km^{2} (45.96 sq mi)
- Elevation: 2,600 m (8,500 ft)

Population (2007)
  - Total: 314,431
  - Density: 2,641.4/km^{2} (6,841.2/sq mi)
- Time zone: UTC-5 (Colombia Standard Time)
- Website: Official website

Usme is the 5th locality of the Capital District of Bogotá, capital city of Colombia. Usme is located in the south of Bogotá, bordering to the north the localities of San Cristóbal, Rafael Uribe Uribe and Tunjuelito, to the west the locality of Ciudad Bolívar, to the south the locality of Sumapaz, and to the east, behind the Eastern Hills, the municipalities of Ubaque, Chipaque and Une in the Department of Cundinamarca.

== History ==
Usme was inhabited first by indigenous groups during the Herrera Period and later by the Muisca.

The modern locality of Usme was founded in 1650 as "San Pedro de Usme" which became a center for the rural areas nearby dedicated to agricultural activities. These supplied food to Bogotá. It was named after San Pedro (Saint Peter) and Usme from Muysccubun, meaning Nest of love. The daughter of zipa Saguamanchica was called Usminia. In 1911, it became a municipality of Cundinamarca with the name Usme and became known for its constant problems between landlords, tenants and peasant workers for the land. During the mid 20th century, an agrarian reform finally arranged the land. The area then shifted from an agricultural production to industrial materials production mainly for construction, giving way to numerous quarries. In 1972, Usme was assigned to Bogotá's district as one of its localities.

== Geography ==
Usme has one of Bogotá's natural parks, called Entrenubes ("between the clouds") in the Eastern Hills, destined for ecotourism and to preserve the local wildlife.

=== Neighborhoods and villages ===
Usme has 126 neighborhoods and 17 veredas.

Of the neighborhoods, the most important are: Downtown Usme (Usme Centro or Usme Pueblo), Yomasa, El Uval, Monte Blanco, Santa Librada, Chiguaza, El Virrey, Chuniza, Puerta al Llano, Usminia, La Aurora, Marichuela, Sauces Miravalle, Santa Marta, Barranquillita, San Andres de los Altos, Costa Rica, Villa Isabel, Las Quintas, La Cabaña, Betania, Danubio Azul, La Fiscala, Chuniza, Lorenzo Alcantuz, Comuneros, La Requilina, Serranias, among others.

== Transportation ==
Usme's main point of access is the Avenida Caracas which is covered by the TransMilenio bus service terminating in the Portal de Usme Station (Line H). The Avenida Caracas then becomes a highway which connects Bogotá and Cundinamarca Department with the plains of the Llanos Orientales in the Meta Department towards its capital Villavicencio.
