= Tunjuelito =

- Locality of Bogotá
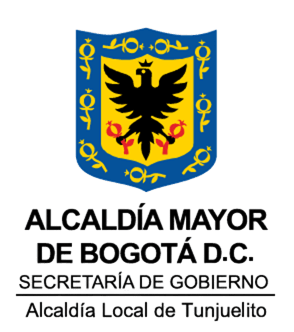
- Flag Coat of arms

- Location of the locality in the city of Bogotá

- Location of the locality in the Capital District of Bogotá
- Coordinates: 4°34′56″N 74°07′55″W
- Country: Colombia
- City: Bogotá D.C.
- Neighbourhoods: List: Ciudad Tunal; Venecia (Bogotá)

Area
  - Total: 9.91 km^{2} (3.83 sq mi)
- Elevation: 2,600 m (8,500 ft)

Population (2007)
  - Total: 182,532
  - Density: 18,400/km^{2} (47,700/sq mi)
- Time zone: UTC-5 (Colombia Standard Time)
- Website: Official website

Tunjuelito is the 6th locality of the Capital District of the Colombian capital, Bogotá. Tunjuelito is located in the south of Bogotá, bordering to the north with the localities of Bosa, Kennedy and Puente Aranda, to the east with the localities of Rafael Uribe Uribe and Usme, to the south with Usme and to the west with Ciudad Bolívar. This district is mostly inhabited by working and lower class residents.

== Etymology ==
The locality is named Tunjuelito as a diminutive form of tunjo, the votive figures of the indigenous Muisca.

== Points of interest ==
The locality hosts Parque El Tunal and the Biblioteca El Tunal, part of Biblored's network of libraries.

== Neighborhoods ==
Tunjuelito, El Tunal, San Benito, San Vicente Ferrer, Fátima, El Carmen, San Carlos, Muzú, Venecia, Isla del Sol and La Sevillana.

== Transportation ==
The main entrance to Tunjuelito is through the Avenida Caracas and the Avenida Ciudad de Villavicencio, which is also served by a TransMilenio route, with a station named Portal del Tunal (Line H), also receiving subroutes from the Calle 40 Sur Station and Portal del Tunal. Apart from the TransMilenio, other transportation companies cover the route Autopista Sur, Diagonal 44 Sur, Carrera 24 and the Avenida Jorge Gaitán Cortés.
