= Calle 40 Sur (TransMilenio) =

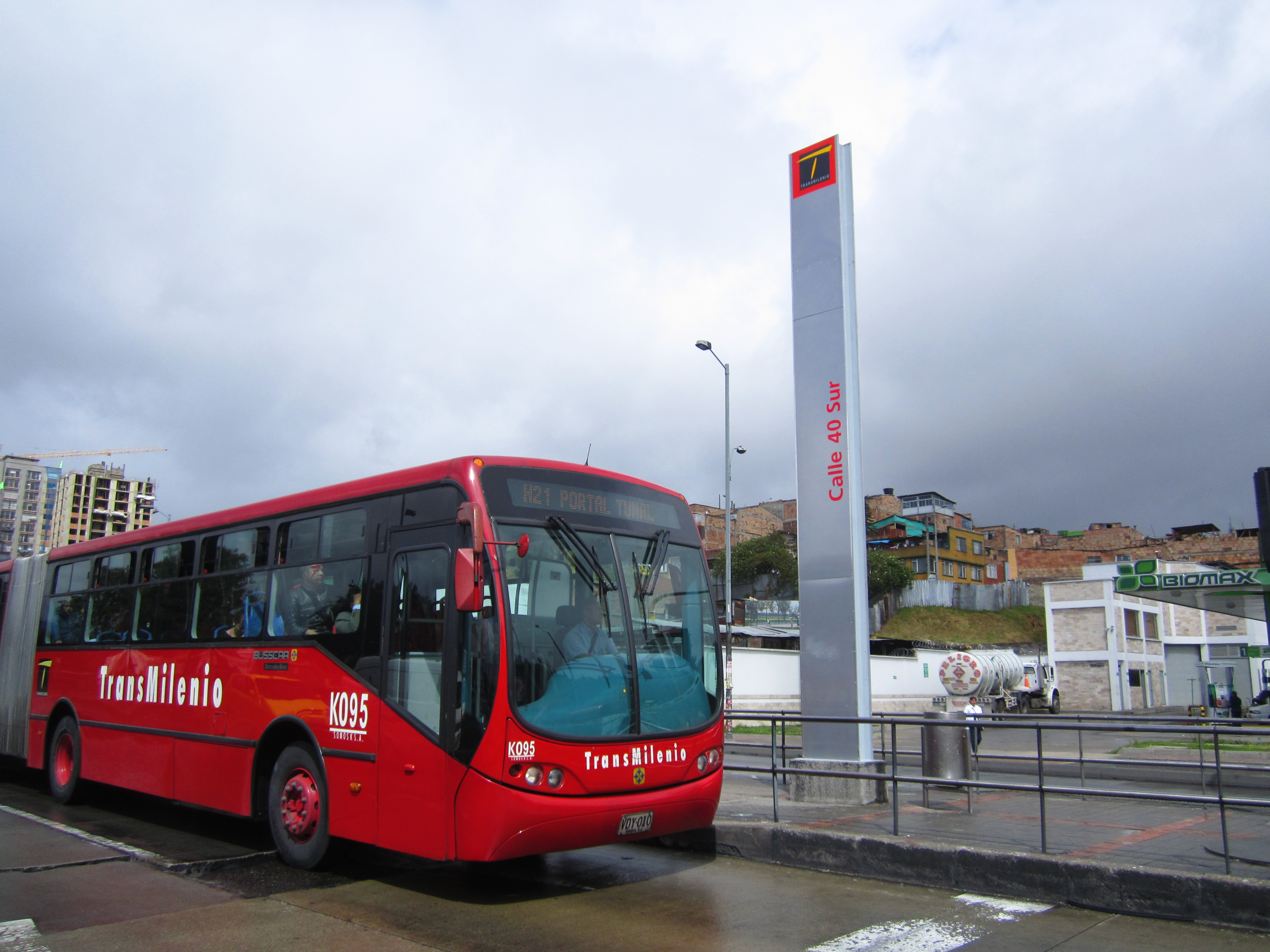

General information
- Location: Avenida Caracas with Calles 39 sur and 41B Sur; Rafael Uribe Uribe
- Line: Caracas Sur
- Platforms: 3

History
- Opened: June 9, 2001

Services
Preceding station	TransMilenio	Following station
Quiroga towards Tercer Milenio	H	Santa Lucía towards Portal de Usme or Portal del Tunal
Location

The intermediate station Calle 40 Sur is part of the TransMilenio mass-transit system of Bogotá, Colombia, opened in the year 2000.

== Location ==
The station is located in southern Bogotá, specifically on Avenida Caracas with Calles 39 and 41B sur.

It serves Santa Lucía, Inglés, and Claret neighborhoods.

== History ==
At the beginning of 2001, the second phase of the Caracas line of the system was opened from Tercer Milenio to the intermediate station Calle 40 Sur. A few months later, service was extended south to Portal de Usme.

The station is named Calle 40 Sur due to its proximity to that major road.

== Station Services ==
=== Old trunk services ===
Services rendered until April 29, 2006
Kind	Routes	Frequency
Current	2 Portal Norte 3 Portal Norte	Every 3 minutes on average
Express	Expreso 20 Expreso 30 Expreso 50 Expreso 60 Expreso 90	Every 2 minutes on average
Express Dominical	Expreso Dominical 15 Expreso Dominical 25	Every 3 or 4 minutes on average

=== Main line service ===
Service as of April 29, 2006
Type	Northern Routes	Southern Routes
Local	3	3
Express Every day All day	B75 / C15	H15 / H75
Express Monday through Saturday; All day	D20 / D21 / K54	H20 / H21 / H54
Express Monday through Saturday; Morning rush	B71	
Express Monday through Friday; Morning rush	B27	H27 / H73

=== Feeder routes ===
The following feeder routes are served on the eastern side of the station:

- 7.1 Uribe Uribe loop
- 7.2 El Tunal loop
- 7.3 Inglés loop

=== Inter-city service ===
This station does not have inter-city service.

== See also ==
- Bogotá
- TransMilenio
- List of TransMilenio Stations
