= Tercer Milenio (TransMilenio) =

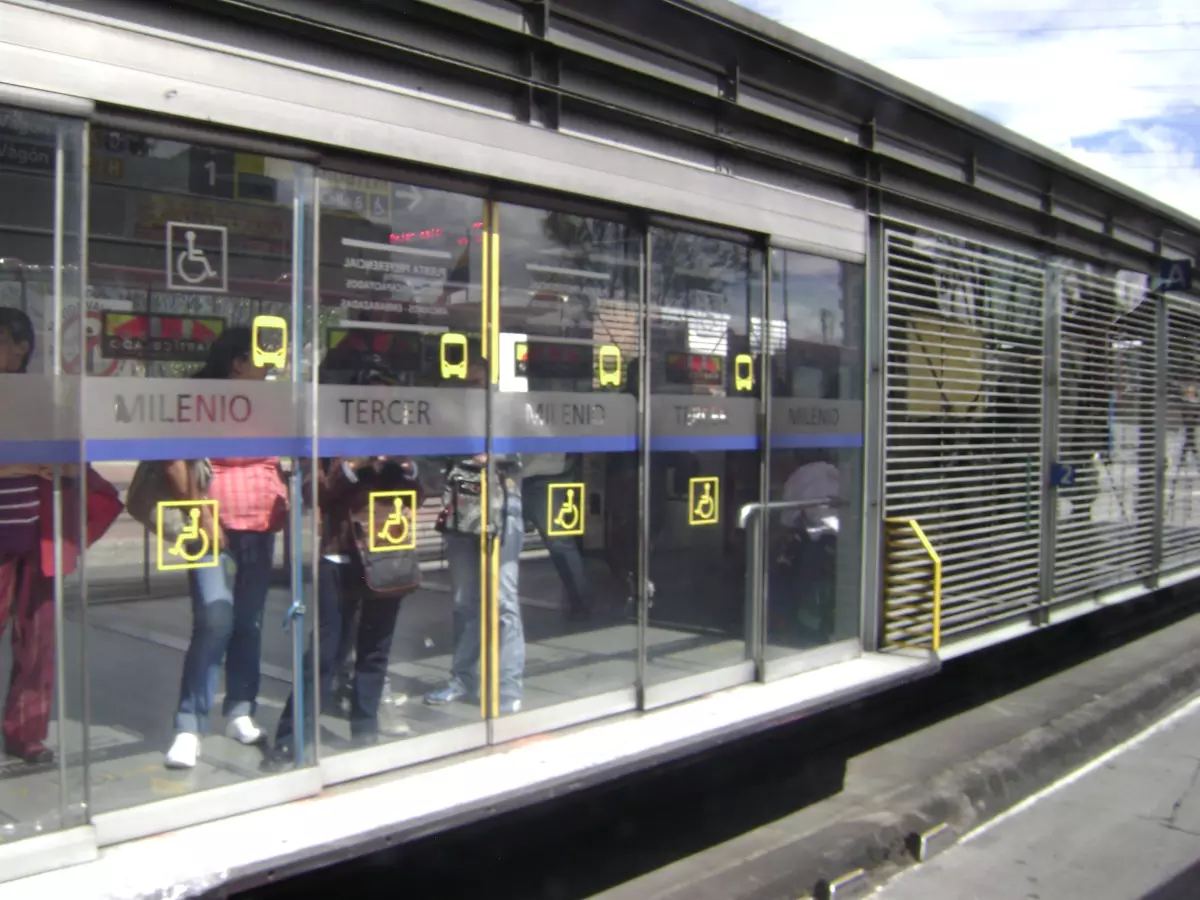

General information
- Location: Avenida Caracas between calles 6 and 8. Santa Fe and Los Mártires
- Line(s): Caracas
- Platforms: 3

History
- Opened: December 17, 2000

Services
Preceding station	TransMilenio	Following station
Avenida Jiménez towards Calle 76	A	Terminus
Terminus	H	Hospital towards Portal de Usme or Portal del Tunal

The simple-station Tercer Milenio is part of the TransMilenio mass-transit system of Bogotá, Colombia, opened in the year 2000.

== Location ==
The station is located in the center of the city, more specifically on Caracas Avenue between Avenida de los Comuneros and Diagonal 7 Bis.

It meets the demand of the neighborhoods La Estanzuela, Santa Inés, San Bernardo, Eduardo Santos and its surroundings.

In the vicinity are:

- The main headquarters of the Policía Metropolitana de Bogotá
- The Parque Tercer Milenio
- The Instituto Nacional de Medicina Legal y Ciencias Forenses.

== Etymology ==
The station receives its name from Parque Tercer Milenio, located on the eastern side. This park is recognized for being the largest park in the downtown area of Bogotá as well as for renovating an area previously depressed, known as El Cartucho.

== Station services ==
=== Old trunk services ===
Services rendered until April 29, 2006
Kind	Routes	Frequency
Current	1 Portal 80 2 Portal Norte 3 Portal Norte	Every 3 minutes on average
Express	Expreso 30	Every 2 minutes on average
Express Dominical	Expreso Dominical 15	Every 3 or 4 minutes on average

=== Main line service ===
Service as of April 29, 2006
Type	Northern Routes	Southern Routes
Local	3 / 8	3 / 8
Express Every Day all day	K10 / C15	L10 / H15
Express Monday through Saturday all day	B13 / B18	H13 / L18

=== Feeder routes ===
This station does not have connections to feeder routes.

=== Inter-city service ===
This station does not have inter-city service.

== See also ==
- Bogotá
- TransMilenio
- List of TransMilenio Stations
