= Portal del Tunal (TransMilenio) =

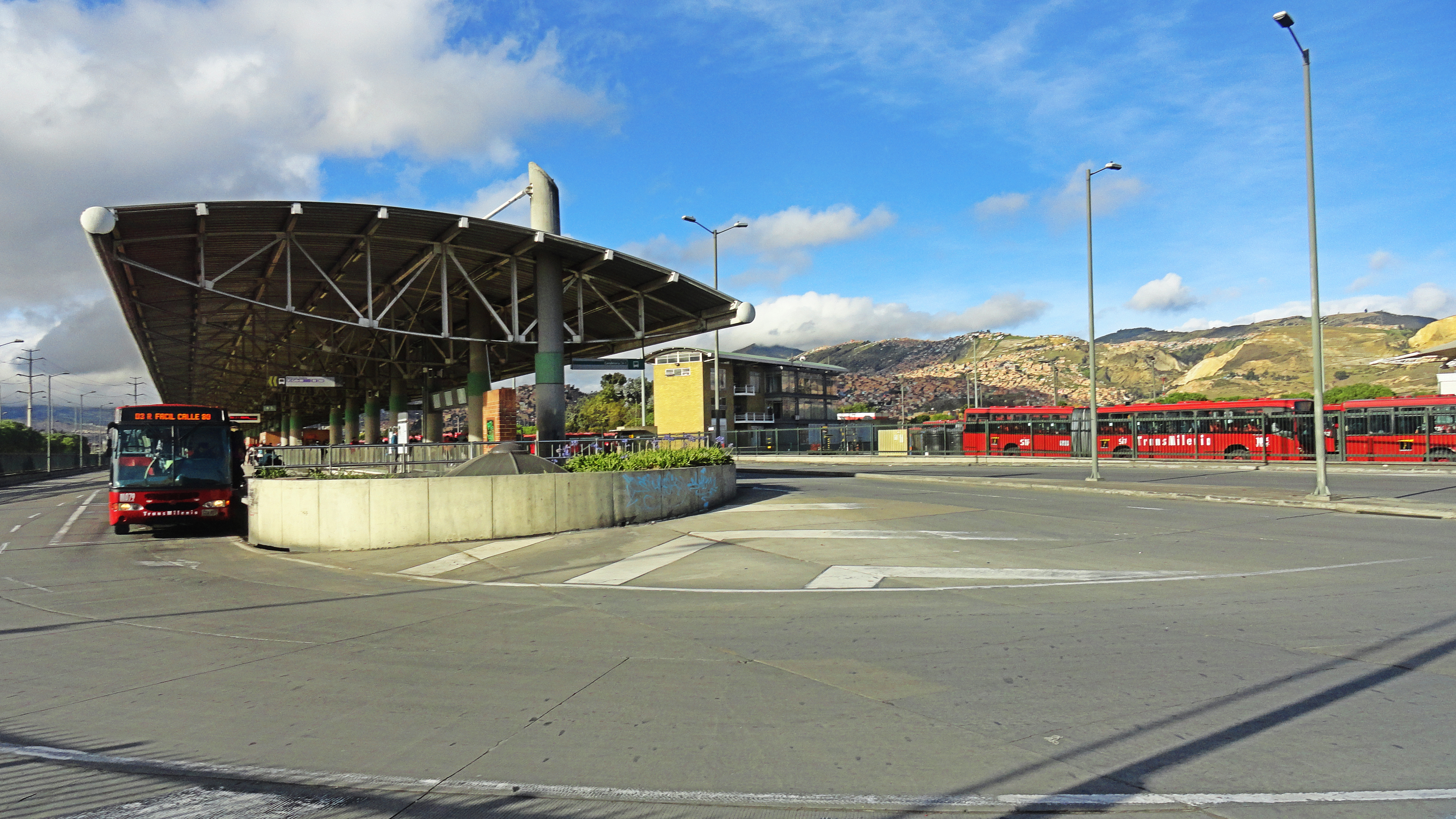

General information
- Location: Av.Calle 56A Sur con Av.Carrera 24; Tunjuelito and Ciudad Bolívar neighborhood
- Line: Caracas Sur - Tunal
- Platforms: 1

History
- Opened: 16 February 2002

Services
Preceding station	TransMilenio	Following station
Parque towards Tercer Milenio	H	Terminus
Location

Portal del Tunal is a terminal station of the TransMilenio mass-transit system of Bogotá, Colombia, opened in the year 2000. Since the end of 2018, it has become a transfer station between the TransMilenio system and the TransMiCable aerial cableway system to the town of Ciudad Bolívar.

== Location ==
The Tunal Portal is located in the southern part of the city, in the Tunjuelito district, across from El Tunal Park, specifically at the intersection of Avenida Boyacá and Avenida Mariscal Sucre (Carrera 24) with Ciudad de Villavicencio Avenue. It has pedestrian access via a pedestrian bridge located at the intersection with Mariscal Sucre Avenue.

The Portal serves the neighborhoods of El Tunal Park, San Benito, Ronda, El Chircal Sur, and surrounding areas.

== Origin of the name ==
The station gets its name from being the starting station of the Caracas Sur line of TransMilenio and from the homonymous neighborhood located nearby.

== History ==
In 2002, one month after the opening of Portal del Norte, Portal del Tunal was opened as the fourth terminal station in the TransMilenio system.

In September 2016, work began on the TransMiCable, whose central station is located within the Tunal Portal. Likewise, a renovation and expansion of the portal was carried out, building a new platform to allow the connection between the TransMilenio system and the aerial cable line. After several tests, the extension went into operation on December 27, 2018 free of charge for some residents of the sector, two days later it began its commercial operation. On July 22, 2020, the IDU delivered the works to expand the Portal, including a new platform 178 meters long, connected to the existing one by a level crossing. This was inaugurated in April 2021.

== Portal services ==
=== Main services ===
Services provided since April 29, 2006
Type	Routes to the North
Easy route	3
Express services every day all day	C15
Express services Monday to Saturday all day	B13 D21
Express Monday to Friday morning and afternoon rush hour	B27
Routes that end at the station
Ruta fácil	3
Express services every day all day	H15
Express services Monday to Saturday all day	H13 H21
Express services Monday to Friday morning and afternoon rush hour	H27

=== TransMiCable ===
Service provided since December 29, 2018
Type	Line	Length	Terminals	Number of stations	Type of station	Fleet
Cable Car; All day		3,34 km	Tunal - Mirador del Paraíso	4	2 at ground level and 2 elevated	163 cabins

=== Feeder services ===
The following feeder routes also operate in this way:

- 6-1 circular route to the Candelaria neighborhood
- 6-1C circular to the Casalinda neighborhood
- 6-2 circular route to the San Francisco neighborhood
- 6-3 circular route to the Sierra Morena neighborhood
- 6-4 circular route to the Paraíso neighborhood
- 6-5 circular route to the El Tesoro neighborhood (Monday to Saturday) and Tesoro-Arabia (Sundays and public holidays)
- 6-5C circular to the Arabia neighborhood (lunes a sábado)
- 6-6 circular route to the Juan José Rondón neighborhood (peak hours)
- 6-7 circular route to the San Joaquín neighborhood
- 6-8 circular route to the Vista Hermosa neighborhood (peak hours)
- 6-9 circular to the Arborizadora Alta neighborhood
- 6-12 circular route to the Villa Gloria neighborhood

=== Urban services ===
The following urban routes also operate:

- H625 circular route to the Arborizadora Alta-Potosí neighborhood

=== Scheme ===
← North
Tunnel	D21	C15	3	Arrival Main Routes	Arrival Main Routes	Avenida Boyacá	B27	Arrival Main Routes	B13	Arrival Main Routes
			Platform 1			Tunnel		Platform 2		
	H625	6-4 6-8	6-5 6-5C	6-7 6-2	Arrival Feeders	TransMicable	6-1 6-1C	6-12 6-9	6-3 6-6	Arrival Feeders
← North

=== Urban services ===
The following urban routes also operate in the same way SITPon the outer sides of the station, circulating along the mixed traffic lanes above the Avenida Boyacá, with the possibility of transferring using the tarjeta TuLlave:

Paraderos SITP
Code	Sector	Address	Routes
418A11	H Portal Tunal	Av. Boyacá - AK 24	H606H633H618H707H717H718H724 260 330 539 742A C201
418B11	H Portal Tunal	Av. Boyacá - AK 19C	H308H602H608H610H620H631H643H704H705 796A T11 T12
119A11	H Parque El Tunal	Av. Boyacá - AK 24	6-18A606A610B608B631C705D717F718K308K707 260 330 539 742A T11
119B11	H Parque El Tunal	Av. Boyacá - AK 24	A633A643A704K724L602 796A C201 T12

== See also ==
- Bogotá
- TransMilenio
- List of TransMilenio stations
