= Portal de Usme (TransMilenio) =

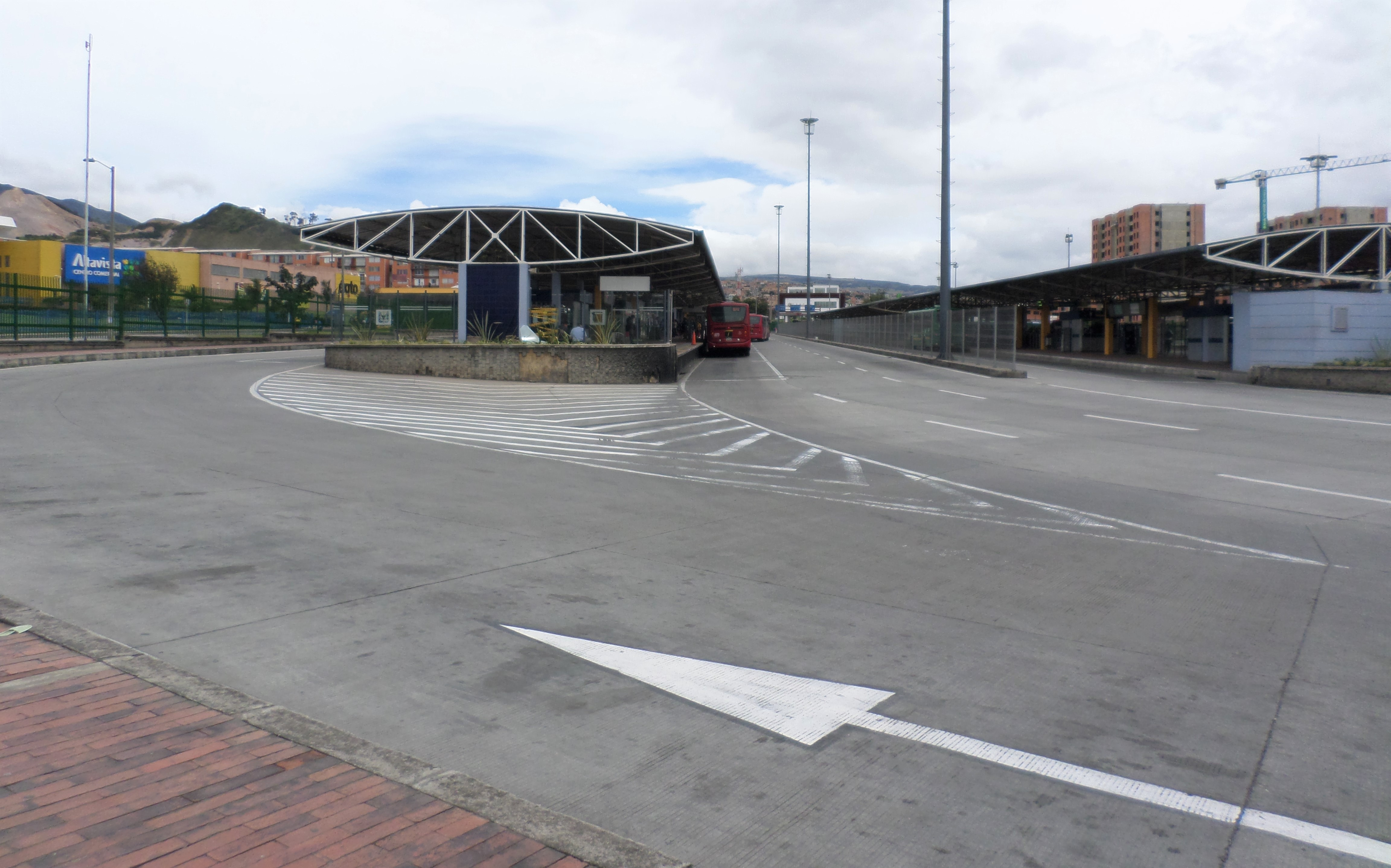

General information
- Location: Avenida Caracas with Calle 63 sur Usme neighborhood
- Line: Caracas Sur - Usme
- Platforms: 2

History
- Opened: August 6, 2001

Services
Preceding station	TransMilenio	Following station
Danubio towards Tercer Milenio	H	Terminus
Location

Portal de Usme is one of the terminal stations in the TransMilenio mass-transit system of Bogotá, Colombia, opened in the year 2000.

== Location ==
The portal is located in the southeastern part of the city, specifically on Avenida Caracas, south of La Picota National Penitentiary, at the intersection with the extension of Avenida Boyacá.

The portal is accessed via a pedestrian entrance a few meters south of Calle 65C Sur.

The portal serves the neighborhoods of Porvenir, Barranquillita, Nuevo San Andrés, La Aurora, and the surrounding areas.

== History ==
In August 2001, a few months after the system's inauguration, the Usme Portal was opened, becoming the second terminal station of the TransMilenio system to become operational.

On December 31, 2001, the recklessness of a Panamericano bus driver resulted in the first fatality on the TransMilenio system. The accident occurred as the bus was approaching the Usme Portal when it entered the TransMilenio lane.

On February 2, 2002, the police thwarted a dynamite attack against this portal. Six bomb cylinders were seized.

Following a complaint filed by a user regarding the lack of accessibility for disabled people on feeder buses at the Usme Portal, the entire fleet of feeder buses was renewed on March 25, 2005.

Since August 1, 2009, the Portal has had a BibloRed library station, located in the tunnel next to the access stairs. It is a space where users can consult books and participate in free activities.

Since approximately 2013, the Portal has included the Publio Martínez Ardila Theater near the maintenance yard, where the system's buses are parked and maintained. This theater, with a capacity of 172 people in its auditorium, regularly offers free performances and cultural presentations to the community.

== Portal services ==
=== Main services ===
Services provided since April 29, 2006
Type	Routes to the North	Routes to the West
Express services every day all day	B72 B75 M83	K54
Express services Monday to Saturday all day	D20	
Express services Monday to Friday all day	C17	
Express services Monday to Friday morning rush hour	J76	
Saturday Express from 4:00 a.m. to 3:00 p.m.	C17	
Routes that end the journey
Express services every day all day	H54 H72 H75 H83	
Express services Monday to Saturday all day	H20	
Express services Monday to Friday all day	H17	
Express services Monday to Friday afternoon rush hour	H76	
Saturday Express from 5:00 a.m. to 3:00 p.m.	H17	

=== Scheme ===
		Avenida Caracas				
South →		Tunnel	South →			
Feeder arrival		Tunnel	3-9	3-14H735	3-4	3-103-5
		Tunnel		Platform 1		
Arrival of trunk lines	C17	Tunnel	Arrival of trunk lines	B72	Arrival of trunk lines	B75
South →		Tunnel	South →			
South →		Tunnel	South →			
Feeder arrival		Tunnel	3-12	3-8H729	3-113-13	3-23-3
		Tunnel		Platform 2		
Arrival of trunk lines	D20	Tunnel	Arrival of trunk lines	J76M83	Arrival of trunk lines	K54
South →

=== Feeder services ===
The following feeder routes also operate:

- 3-2 circular route to the Santa Librada neighborhood
- 3-3 circular route to the Chuniza neighborhood
- 3-4 circular route to the Alfonso López neighborhood
- 3-5 circular route to the Usminia neighborhood
- 3-8 circular route to the Virrey neighborhood
- 3-9 circular route to the Marichuela neighborhood
- 3-10 circular route to Usme Centro (former village of Usme)
- 3-11 circular to the La Fiscala neighborhood
- 3-12 circular route to the neighborhoods La Esperanza Sur - El Bosque
- 3-13 circular to the Nebraska neighborhood
- 3-14 circular route to the El Uval neighborhood

=== Urban services ===
The following urban route works in the same way:

- H729 circular route to the La Aurora neighborhood
- H735 circular route to the El Uval neighborhood

=== Urban services ===
The following urban routes also operate in the same way SITPon the outer sides of the station, circulating along the mixed traffic lanes above the Avenida Caracas, with the possibility of transferring using the tarjeta TuLlave:

SITP bus stops
Code	Sector	Address	Routes
010A12	H Ladrillera Santafé	Av. Caracas - CL 65 Sur	A702A706A708A720A725B907G530H726K715K721L723 E44
010B12	H C.C. Altavista	Av. Caracas - CL 67A Sur	H710H711H737K700 614 TC30

== See also ==
- Bogotá
- TransMilenio
- List of TransMilenio stations
