= Avenida Caracas =

Road in Bogotá, Colombia

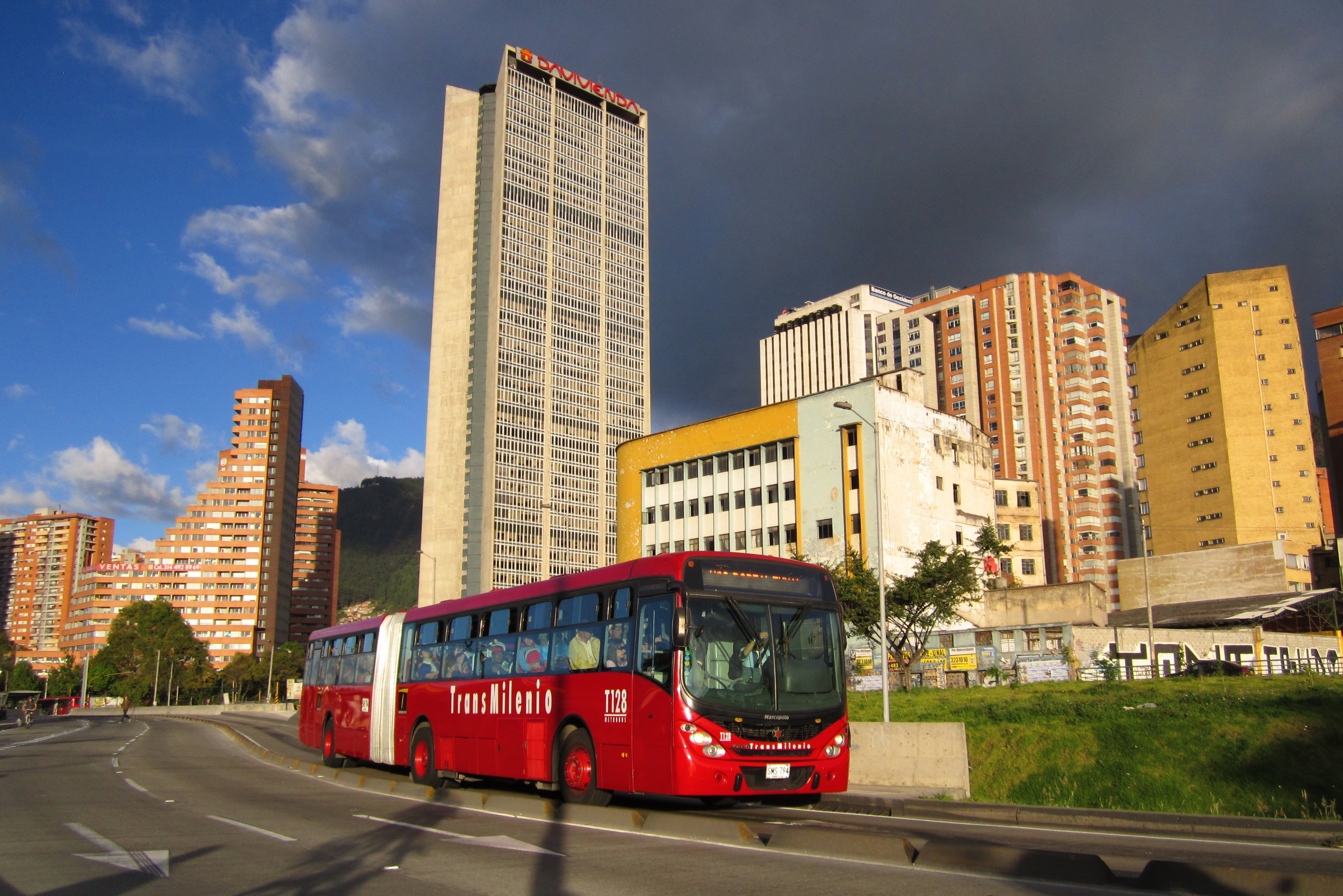
- Transmilenio bus on Avenida Caracas

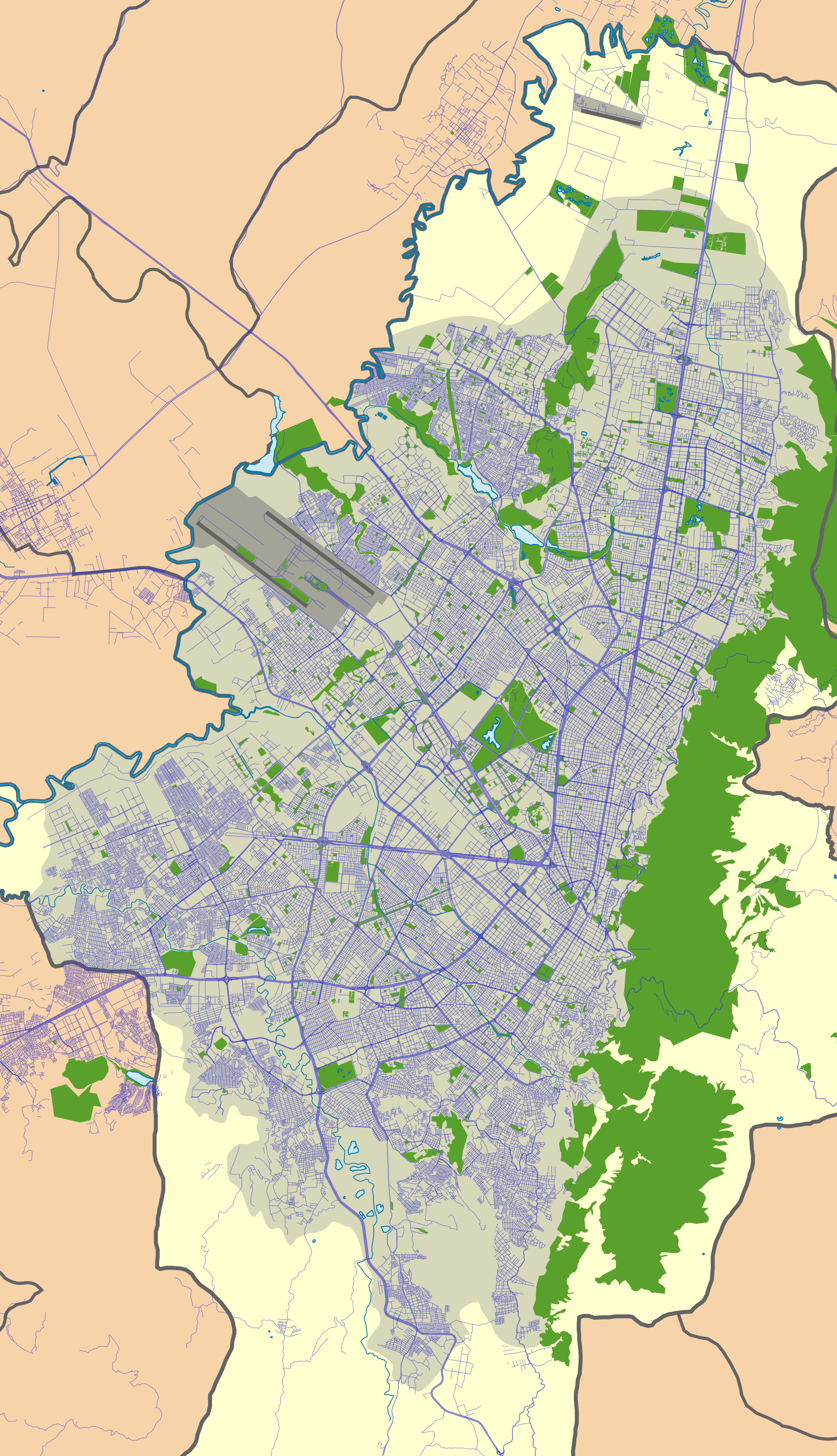
- Location within Bogotá
- Length: 25 km (16 mi)
- Location: Bogotá; Colombia
- Coordinates: 4°38′47″N 74°03′54″W
- South end: Usme
- North end: Avenida Calle 80, Autopista Norte

Avenida Caracas is an arterial road in Bogotá, Colombia that runs through the city from north to south.

The road was inaugurated on 9 December 1932.

== Names ==
The road has four names along its stretch: Avenida Caracas, Troncal Caracas, Carrera 14, and Carretera a Usme.

== Route ==
The road begins in the southern ward of Usme, where it is named Carretera a Usme. It runs north to Calle 70 Sur.

It continues north to the Portal de Usme, where it is known as the Troncal Caracas. It continues through the neighborhoods Ciudad Bolívar, Rafael Uribe Uribe, Antonio Nariño, Los Mártires, Santa Fe and Chapinero, until Calle 80 near the monument Los Héroes. It continues north to Chía with the name Autopista Norte.

== Points of interest on the route ==
- The TransMilenio stations Portal de Usme, Avenida Jiménez, and Tercer Milenio.
- Parque Tercer Milenio
- The headquarters of the Colombian National Police
- Downtown Bogotá
- Part of the commercial area Chapinero
- The Los Héroes monument
