= Ferias (TransMilenio) =

General information
- Location: Engativá; Colombia

History
- Opened: 2000

Services
Preceding station	TransMilenio	Following station
Avenida 68 towards Portal de la 80	D	Boyacá towards Polo

The simple station Ferias is part of the TransMilenio mass-transit system of Bogotá, Colombia, opened in the year 2000.

== Location ==
The station is located in northwestern Bogotá, specifically on Calle 80 with Transversal 69R.

It serves the Ferias, Las Ferias Occidental, and Santa Rosa neighborhoods.

Carrefour Calle 80 is situated on the north side of the station.

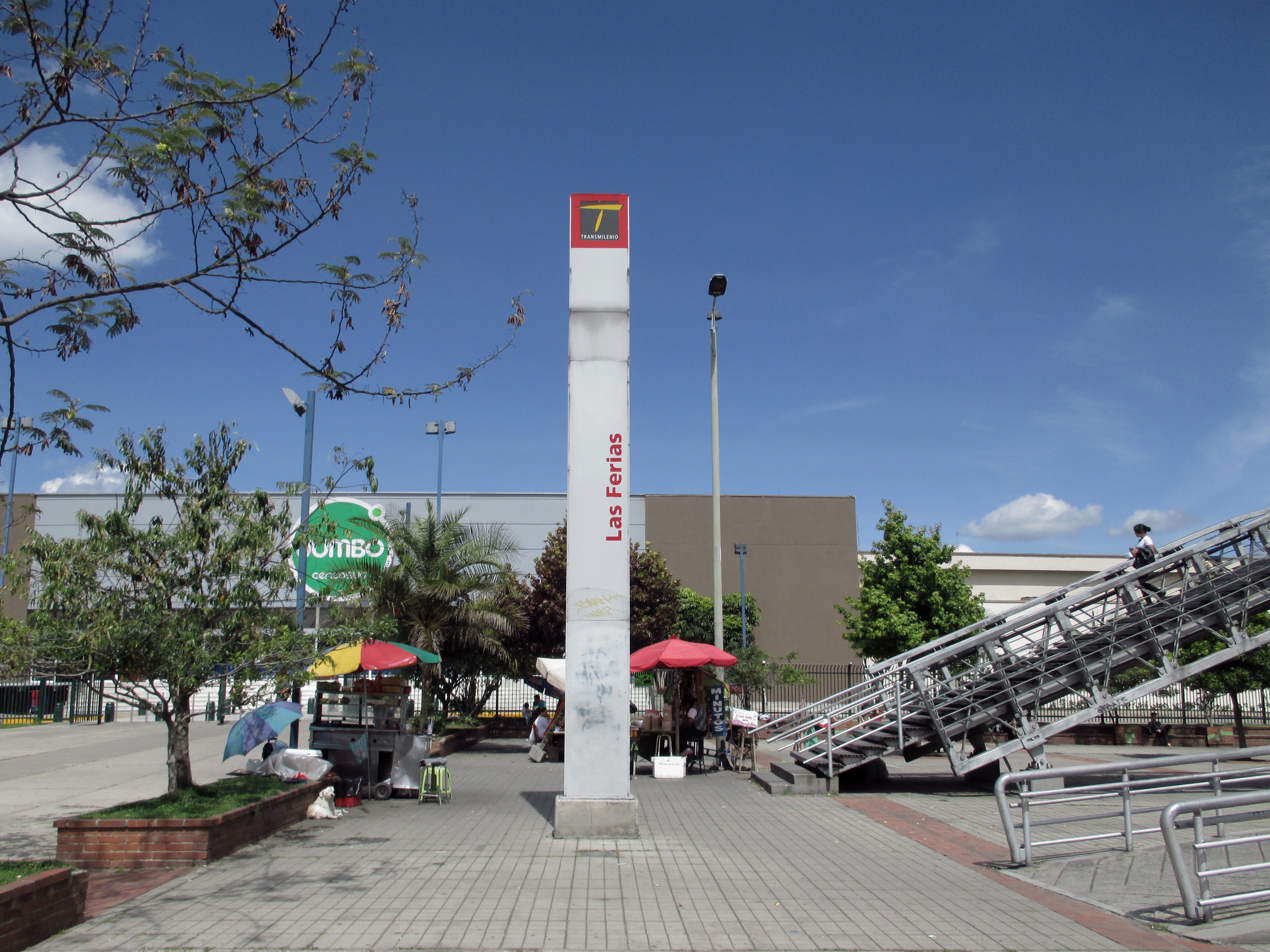
Ferias (TransMilenio)

== History ==
In 2000, phase one of the TransMilenio system was opened between Portal de la 80 and Tercer Milenio, including this station.

The station is named Ferias due to the neighborhood of the same name that surrounds it.

== Station Services ==
=== Old trunk services ===
Services rendered until April 29, 2006
Kind	Routes	Frequency
Current		Every 3 minutes on average
Express Dominical	Expreso Dominical 15	Every 3 or 4 minutes on average

=== Main line service ===
Service as of April 29, 2006
Type	Northwestern Routes	North or South Routes	Frequency
Local	6	6	Every three minutes
Express Monday through Saturday all day	D20	H20	Every two minutes
Express Sunday and holidays	D94	B94	Every 3–4 minutes

=== Feeder routes ===
This station does not have connections to feeder routes.

=== Inter-city service ===
This station does not have inter-city service.

== See also ==
- Bogotá
- TransMilenio
- List of TransMilenio Stations
