= Carrera 90 (TransMilenio) =

Part of the TransMilenio mass-transit system of Bogotá

General information
- Location: Engativá; Colombia

History
- Opened: 2000

Services
| Preceding station | TransMilenio | Following station |
|---|---|---|
| Avenida Ciudad de Cali towards Portal de la 80 | D | Quirigua towards Polo |

The simple station Carrera 90 is part of the TransMilenio mass-transit system of Bogotá, Colombia, opened in the year 2000.

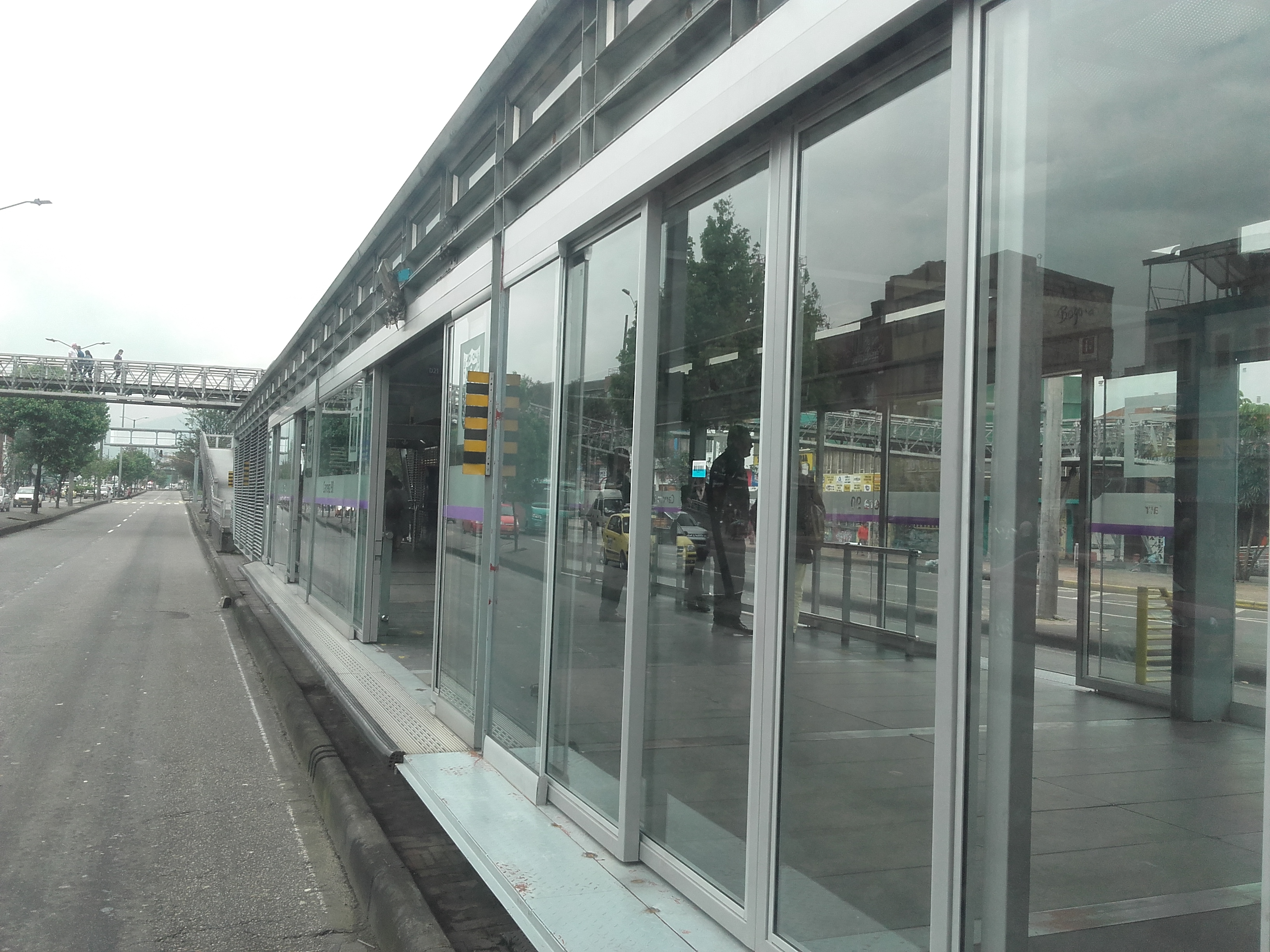
Carrera 90 (TransMilenio)

== Location ==
The station is located in northwestern Bogotá, specifically on Calle 80 Carrera 90.

== History ==
In 2000, phase one of the TransMilenio system was opened between Portal de la 80 and Tercer Milenio, including this station. The station is named Carrera 90 due to its location at the intersection of that road with Avenida Calle 80. It serves the demand of the Primavera Norte, Los Cerezos, and París Gaitán neighborhoods. On its north side, there is a small shopping center called Primavera.

== Station Services ==
=== Old trunk services ===
Services rendered until April 29, 2006
| Kind | Routes | Frequency |
|---|---|---|
| Current | | Every 3 minutes on average |
| Express | Expreso 20 Expreso 90 | Every 2 minutes on average |
| Super Express | Expreso 200 Expreso 300 | Every 2 minutes on average |

=== Main line service ===
Service as of April 29, 2006
| Type | Northwestern Routes | North, South or East Routes | Frequency |
|---|---|---|---|
| Local | 6 | 6 | Every three minutes |
| Express Monday through Saturday; All day | D10 / D21 | B10 / H21 | Every two minutes |

=== Feeder routes ===
This station does not have connections to feeder routes.

=== Inter-city service ===
This station does not have inter-city service.

== See also ==
- Bogotá
- TransMilenio
- List of TransMilenio Stations
