= Avenida 68 (TransMilenio) =

General information
- Location: Engativá; Colombia

History
- Opened: 2000

Services
Preceding station	TransMilenio	Following station
Carrera 53 towards Portal de la 80	D	Ferias towards Polo
Location

The simple station Avenida 68 is part of the TransMilenio mass-transit system of Bogotá, Colombia, opened in the year 2000.

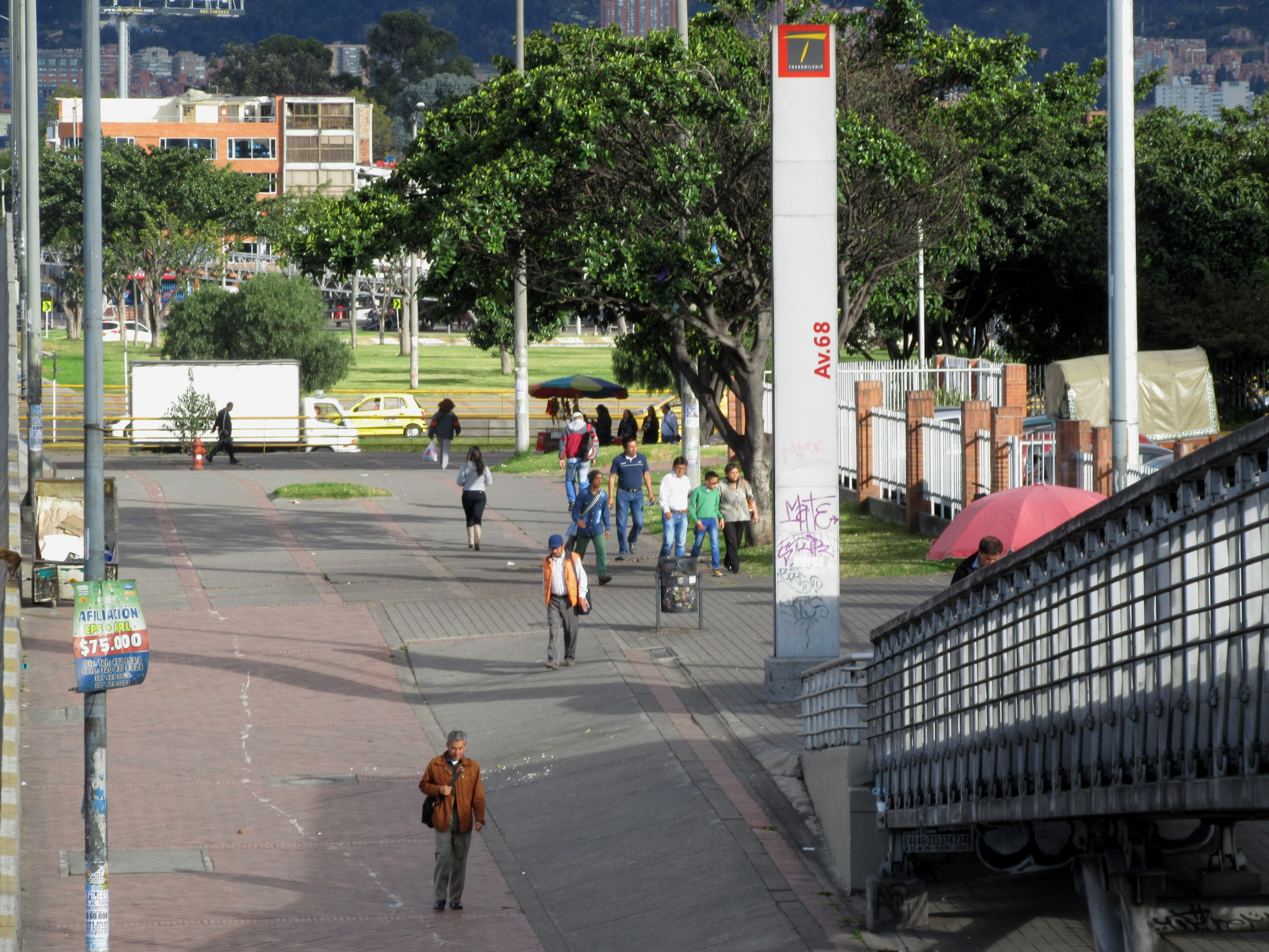
Avenida 68 (TransMilenio)

== Location ==
The station is located in northwestern Bogotá, specifically on Calle 80 with Carrera 68C.

It serves the Metropolis, Las Ferias, and La Floresta neighborhoods.

On the north side of the station, there is a Homecenter location. To the south there is an Éxito location. It is the closest station to the Metropoís neighborhood and the Cafam in Floresta.

== History ==
In 2000, phase one of the TransMilenio system was opened between Portal de la 80 and Tercer Milenio, including this station.

The station is named Avenida 68 due to its location two blocks from that major road.

In 2009, Enrique Peñalosa, the mayor of Bogota at the time, stated that the cost of the line per 1 km was $34m.

In 2020, an expansion plan was devised for Avenida 68 to expand bus services in western Bogota. The plan expands Avenida 68 to 17 km, with a start in Autopista Sur and an end in Septima, with high demand being cited as the reason for the plan. Claudia López tried to pause it during Peñalosa's administration, but failed and decided to continue the plan during her term, which caused criticism from her allies, Alianza Verde and el Polo, for failing to fulfill her campaign promise to stop expanding TransMilenio.

As of October 2026, there is currently a trunk line under construction along Avenida 68 with 89% completion, and it is planned to be operational this year.

== Station services ==
=== Old trunk services ===
Services rendered until April 29, 2006
Kind	Routes	Frequency
Current		Every 3 minutes on average
Express	Expreso 40 Expreso 90	Every 2 minutes on average
Super Express	Super Express 300 Super Express 301	Every 2 minutes on average
Express Dominical	Expreso Dominical 15 Expreso Dominical 35	Every 3 or 4 minutes on average

=== Main line service ===
Service as of April 29, 2006
Type	Northwestern routes	South routes
Local	6	6
Express every day	D22	G22
Express Monday through Saturday all day	D20 / D70	H20 / J24

=== Dual services ===
Services rendered since May 30, 2015
Kind	Routes to the North	Routes to the South
Dual Monday to Sunday all day	D81	M81

=== Feeder routes ===
This station does not have connections to feeder routes.

=== Inter-city service ===
This station does not have inter-city service.

== See also ==
- List of TransMilenio stations
