= Granja - Carrera 77 (TransMilenio) =

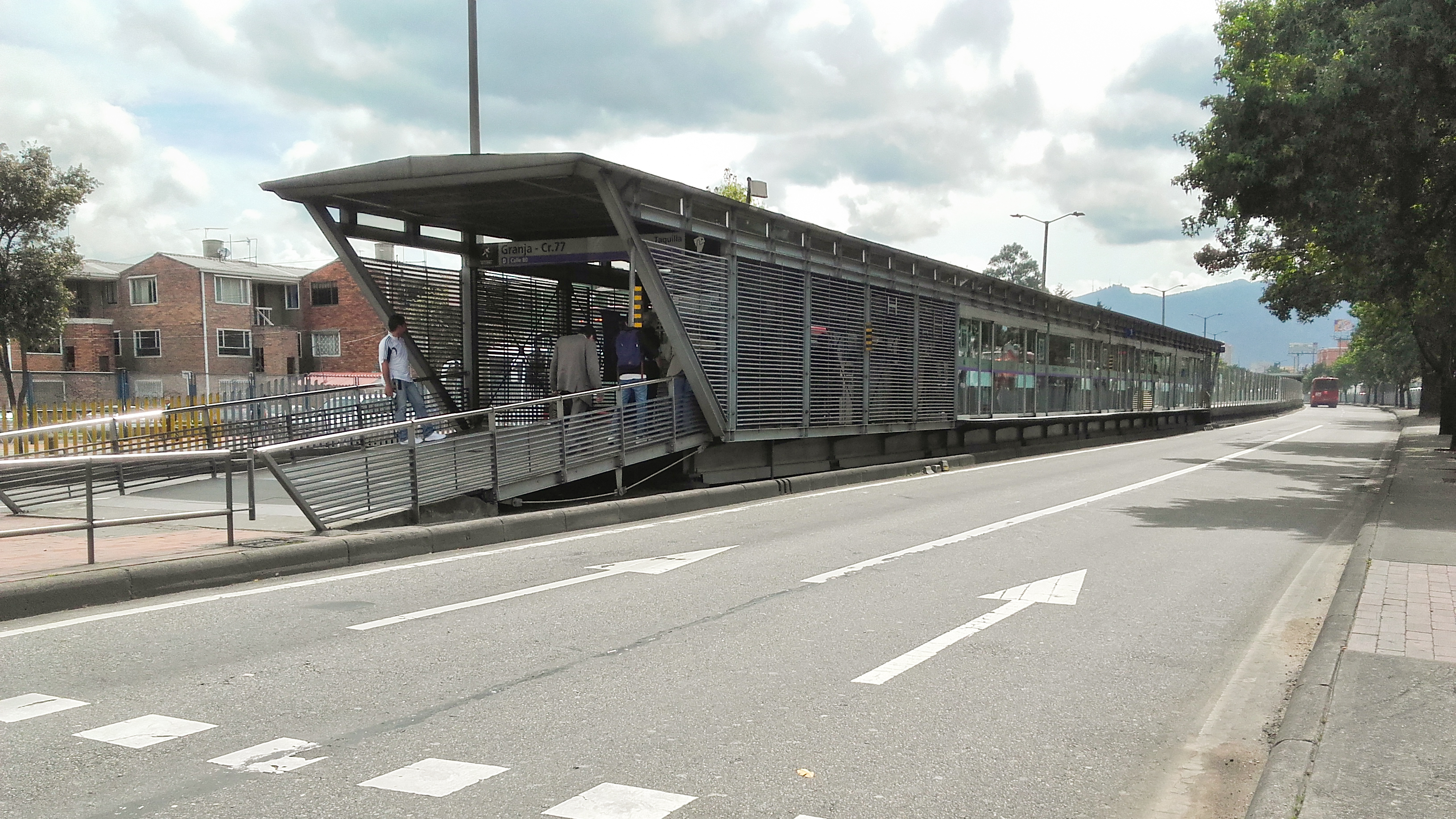

General information
- Location: Calle 80 with Transversal/Carrera 77; Engativá, Bogotá; Colombia

History
- Opened: 2010

Services
Preceding station	TransMilenio	Following station
Minuto de Dios towards Portal de la 80	D	Avenida Ciudad de Cali towards Polo

Granja - Carrera 77 is an intermediate station that was part of the TransMilenio mass-transit system of Bogotá, Colombia.

== Location ==
The station was located in northwestern Bogotá, specifically on Calle 80 with Transversal/Carrera 77.

It served the Tisquesusa and La Almería neighborhoods. Through feeder routes it also serves the Serena, Cerezos, and Florida neighborhoods.

== History ==
In 2000, phase one of the TransMilenio system was opened between Portal de la 80 and Tercer Milenio, including this station.

The station was named Carrera 77 due to its location near the intersection of that road with Calle 80.

In November 2010, the station was intervened and connected with the next one Granja, because of its very high demand. The new station was renamed Granja – Carrera 77.

== Station services ==
=== Old trunk services/Granja ===
Services rendered until April 29, 2006
Kind	Routes	Frequency
Current		Every 3 minutes on average
Express	Expreso 10	Every 2 minutes on average

=== Old trunk services/Carrera 77 ===
Services rendered until April 29, 2006
Kind	Routes	Frequency
Current		Every 3 minutes on average
Express	Expreso 10 Expreso 80 Expreso 140	Every 2 minutes on average
Super Express	Expreso 300 Expreso 301	Every 2 minutes on average
Express Dominical	Expreso Dominical 15 Expreso Dominical 35	Every 3 or 4 minutes on average

=== Main Line Service ===
Service as of April 29, 2006
Type	Northwestern Routes	North or South Routes	Frequency
Local	6	6	Every three minutes
Every days	D22	G22	Every two minutes
Express Monday through Saturday; All day	D10 / D20 / D21 / D70	B10 / H20 / H21 / J24	Every two minutes
Express Monday through Friday; Morning rush	D50	B55	Every two minutes
Express Monday through Friday; Evening rush		F62	Every two minutes
Express Sundays and holidays	D94 / D95	B94 / J95	Every 3–4 minutes

=== Feeder routes ===
The station has connections to the following feeder routes:

- Route 5.1 Suba - Rincón
- Route 5.3 Serena - Cerezos loop
- Route 5.4 Florida loop

The feeder routes 5.2 (Aures-Villamaría loop) and 5.8 (Suba - Compartir loop) were relocated on April 29, 2006 to Portal de Suba.

=== Inter-city service ===
This station does not have inter-city service.

== See also ==
- Bogotá
- TransMilenio
- List of TransMilenio Stations
