= Minuto de Dios (TransMilenio) =

Mass-transit station in Colombia

General information
- Location: Engativá; Colombia

History
- Opened: 2000

Services
Preceding station	TransMilenio	Following station
Boyacá towards Portal de la 80	D	Carrera 77 towards Polo

The simple station Minuto de Dios is part of the TransMilenio mass-transit system of Bogotá, Colombia, opened in the year 2000.

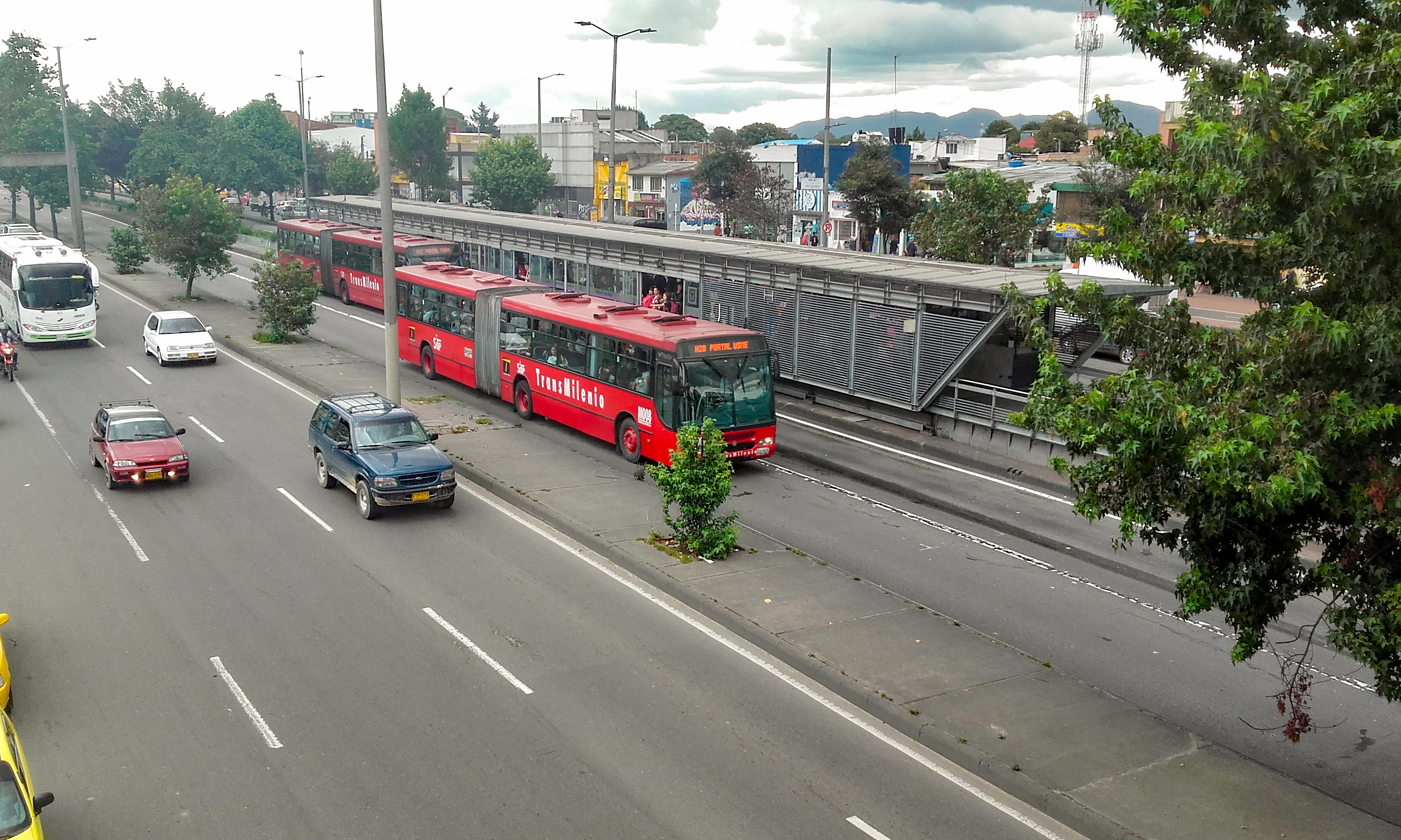
Dios (TransMilenio)

== Location ==
The station is located in northwestern Bogotá, specifically on Avenida Calle 80, with Carrera 73 A, two blocks from Avenida Boyacá.

It serves the demand of the Palestina and Santa María del Lago neighborhoods.

== History ==
In 2000, phase one of the TransMilenio system was opened between Portal de la 80 and Tercer Milenio, including this station.

The station is named Minuto de Dios due to the neighborhood of the same name in which it is located. That neighborhood, in turn, is named for the Minuto de Dios foundation, which has a religious center, museum, and university in the area.

== Station services ==
=== Old trunk services ===
Services rendered until April 29, 2006
Kind	Routes	Frequency
Current		Every 3 minutes on average
Express	Expreso 20 Expreso 90	Every 2 minutes on average
Express Dominical	Expreso Dominical 35	Every 3 or 4 minutes on average

=== Main line service ===
Service as of April 29, 2006
Type	Northwestern Routes	North or South Routes	Frequency
Local	6	6	Every three minutes
Express Every days	D22	G22	Every two minutes
Express Monday through Saturday; All day	D21	H21	Every two minutes
Express Monday through Friday; Morning rush	D50 / D51		Every two minutes
Express Monday through Saturday; Evening rush		F62	Every two minutes
Express Sundays and holidays	D94	B94	Every 3–4 minutes

=== Feeder routes ===
This station does not have feeder routes.

=== Inter-city service ===
This station does not have inter-city service.

== See also ==
- Bogotá
- TransMilenio
- List of TransMilenio stations
