= Polo (disambiguation) =

Polo is a team sport played on horseback.

Polo may also refer to:

== Places ==
=== United States ===
- Polo Township, Carroll County, Arkansas
- Polo, Illinois, United States, a city
- Polo, Missouri, United States, a city northeast of Kansas City
- Polo, Ohio, an unincorporated community

=== Elsewhere ===
- Polo, Dominican Republic, a municipality
- Valenzuela, Metro Manila, originally Polo, a city in the Philippines
- Polo, Valenzuela, a barangay
- Boluo County, Huizhou, Guangdong, China

== People ==
- Polo (surname)
- Polo (given name), a list of people with the given name or nickname
- Polo Barnes (1901–1981), American jazz clarinetist and saxophonist
- Polo Montañez, Cuban singer and songwriter born Fernando Borrego Linares (1955–2002)
- Polo Ravales, Filipino actor and model Paul Gruenberg (born 1982)
- Johnny Polo, former ring name of American professional wrestler Scott Levy (born 1964)
- Marco Polo (producer), Canadian hip hop producer born Marco Bruno
- Mohammed Polo, nickname of Ghanaian former footballer Alhaji Mohammed Ahmed (born 1956)
- Polo G, rapper from Chicago

== Arts, entertainment, and media ==
- Polo (flamenco palo), a musical form of flamenco
- Polo (music), a traditional musical style of Venezuela
- Polo (novel), by Jilly Cooper
- Polo TV, Polish station

== Clothing ==
- Polo neck, a garment also known as a turtle neck
- Polo shirt, also known as a tennis shirt or golf shirt

== Other uses ==
- Volkswagen Polo, a German subcompact car
- Polo (TransMilenio), a mass transit station in Bogotá, Colombia
- Hurricane Polo (disambiguation), various hurricanes
- Operation Polo, code name for the 1948 Indian annexation of Hyderabad
- ADOX Polo, 1960s camera model
- Polo (confectionery)
- Polo wraps, a bandage material for horses' legs

== See also ==
- Alternative Democratic Pole (Spanish: Polo Democrático Alternativo), a Colombian political party
- Polo Ralph Lauren, the flagship brand of the company
- Water polo, a team sport played in water
- Polos, type of crown
- Polos, a feature within the Balinese musical tradition Kotekan
- Marco Polo (disambiguation)
- San Polo (disambiguation)
