= Boyacá (TransMilenio) =

General information
- Location: Calle 80 with Transversal 69 B Engativá, Bogotá; Colombia

History
- Opened: 2000

Services
Preceding station	TransMilenio	Following station
Ferias towards Portal de la 80	D	Minuto de Dios towards Polo

Boyacá is a simple station that is part of the TransMilenio mass-transit system of Bogotá, Colombia.

== Location ==
The station is located in northwestern Bogotá, specifically on Avenida Calle 80 with Transversal 69 B, one block from Avenida Boyacá.

It serves the Santa Rosa and Bonanza neighborhoods.

== History ==
In 2000, phase one of the TransMilenio system was opened between Portal de la 80 and Tercer Milenio, including this station.

The station is named Boyacá due to its proximity to Avenida Boyacá.

== Station services ==
=== Old trunk services ===
Services rendered until April 29, 2006
Kind	Routes	Frequency
Current		Every 3 minutes on average

=== Main line service ===
Service as of April 29, 2006
Type	Northwestern Routes	Southern Routes	Frequency
Local	6	6	Every three minutes
Express Monday through Saturday all day	D20	H20	Every two minutes
Express Sunday and holidays	D95	J95	Every 3–4 minutes

=== Feeder routes ===
This station does not have feeder routes.

=== Inter-city service ===
This station does not have inter-city service.

== See also ==
- List of TransMilenio stations
