= Avenida Ciudad de Cali (TransMilenio) =

Avenida Cali

General information
- Location: Engativá; Colombia

History
- Opened: 2000

Services
| Preceding station | TransMilenio | Following station |
|---|---|---|
| Granja - Carrera 77 towards Portal de la 80 | D | Carrera 90 towards Polo |

The intermediate station Avenida Cali is part of the TransMilenio mass-transit system of Bogotá, Colombia, opened in the year 2000.

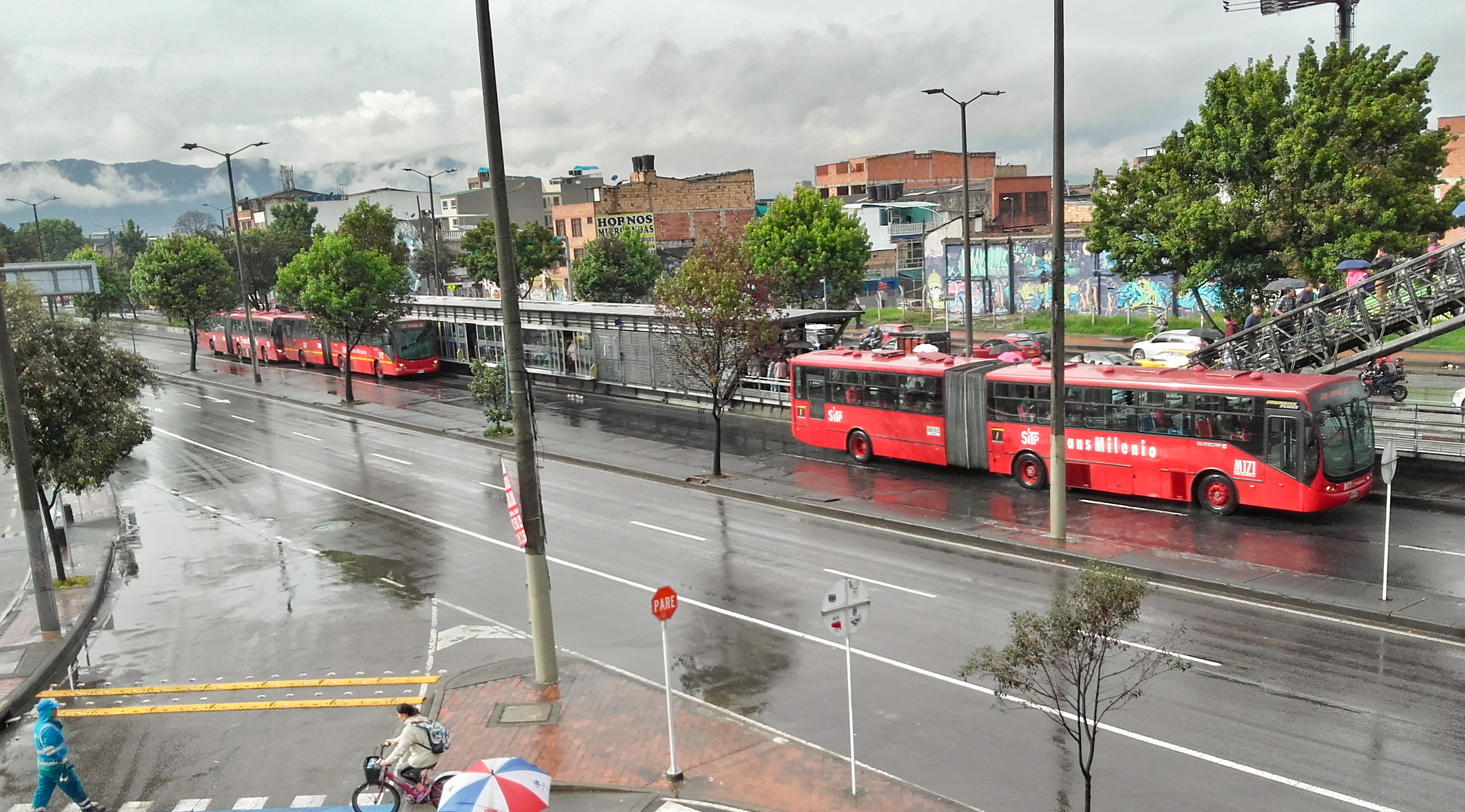
Avenida Ciudad de Cali (TransMilenio)

== Location ==
The station is located in northwestern Bogotá, specifically on Calle 80 with Carrera 85 A, one block from Avenida Ciudad de Cali.

== History ==
In 2000, phase one of the TransMilenio system was opened between Portal de la 80 and Tercer Milenio, including this station.

The station is named Avenida Cali due to its location on the west side of the intersection of Avenida Ciudad de Cali (which is elevated by a bridge) and Avenida Calle 80.

It serves the demand of the La Granja, La Almería, El Morisco, and París Gaitán neighborhoods. Through connections with feeder routes, it also serves the Suba-Rincón area.

== Station services ==
=== Old trunk services ===
Services rendered until April 29, 2006
| Kind | Routes | Frequency |
|---|---|---|
| Current | | Every 3 minutes on average |
| Express | Expreso 10 Expreso 140 | Every 2 minutes on average |
| Express Dominical | Expreso Dominical 15 Expreso Dominical 35 | Every 3 or 4 minutes on average |

=== Main line service ===
Service as of April 29, 2006
| Type | Northwestern Routes | North or South Routes | Frequency |
|---|---|---|---|
| Local | 6 | 6 | Every three minutes |
| Express Monday through Saturday; All day | D10 / D20 / D21 | B10 / H20 / H21 | Every two minutes |
| Express Sundays and holidays | D95 | J95 | Every 3-4 minutes |

=== Feeder routes ===
This station has the following feeder route:

- Route 5.2 Avenida Carrera 91 loop

=== Inter-city service ===
This station does not have inter-city service.

== See also ==
- Bogotá
- TransMilenio
- List of TransMilenio Stations
