= Carrera 53 (TransMilenio) =

Transit station in Bogotá, Colombia

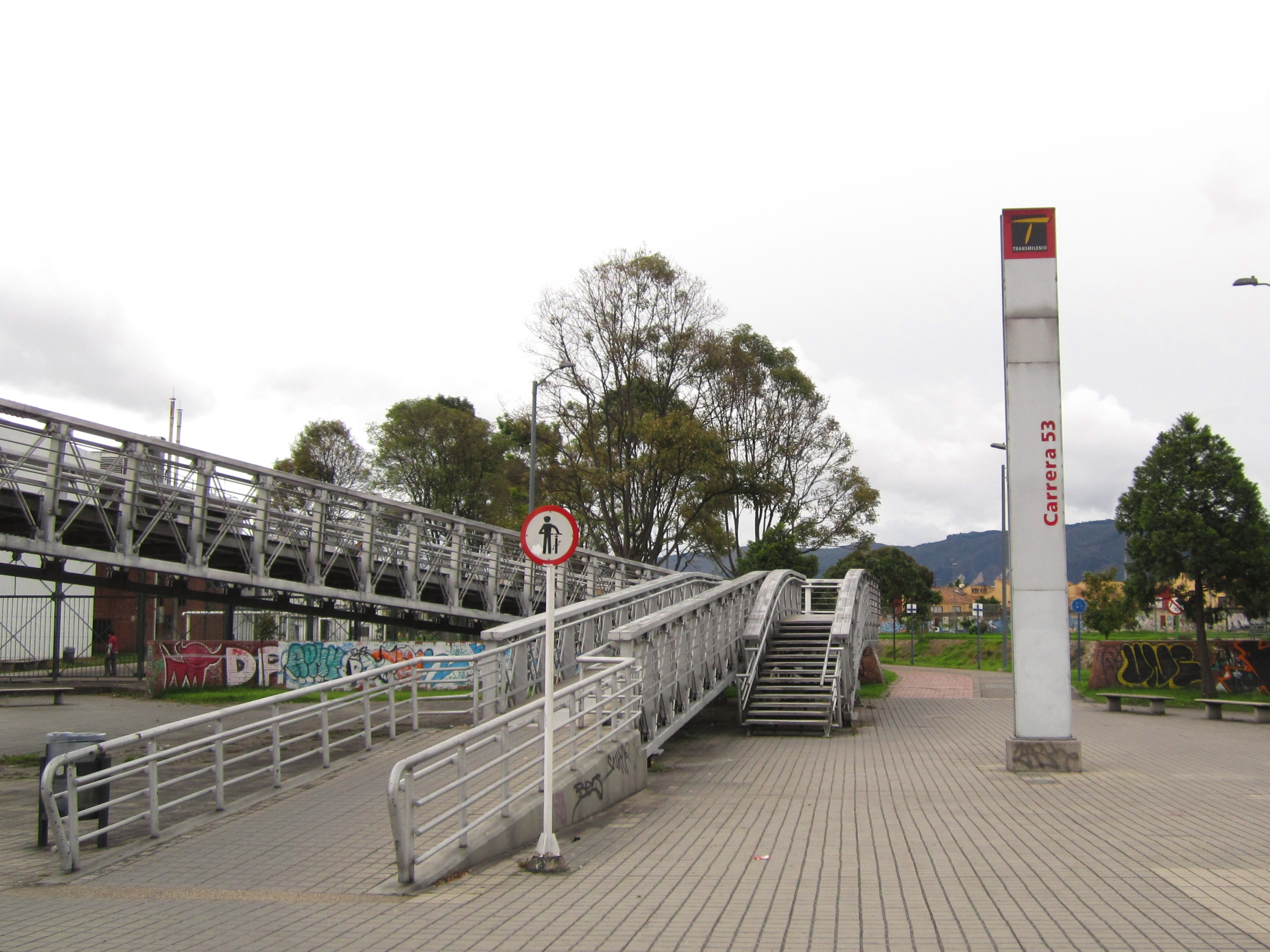

General information
- Location: Barrios Unidos; Colombia

History
- Opened: 2000

Services
Preceding station	TransMilenio	Following station
Carrera 47 towards Portal de la 80	D	Avenida 68 towards Polo
Location

The simple station Carrera 53 is part of the TransMilenio mass-transit system of Bogotá, Colombia, opened in the year 2000.

== Location ==
The station is located in northwestern Bogotá, specifically on Calle 80 with Carrera 65.

It serves the Escuela de Cadetes (Cadets school) and Metropolis neighborhoods.

== History ==
In 2000, phase one of the TransMilenio system was opened between Portal de la 80 and Tercer Milenio, including this station.

The station is named Carrera 53 for its location at the intersection of that road with Avenida Calle 80.

== Station Services ==
=== Old trunk services ===
Services rendered until April 29, 2006
Kind	Routes	Frequency
Current		Every 3 minutes on average

=== Main line service ===
Service as of April 29, 2006
Type	Northwestern Routes	North or South Routes	Frequency
Local	6	6	Every three minutes
Express Monday through Saturday all day	D10	B10	Every two minutes
Express Sunday and Holidays	D94	B94	Every 3–4 minutes

=== Feeder routes ===
This station does not have connections to feeder routes.

=== Inter-city service ===
This station does not have inter-city service.

== See also ==
- Bogotá
- TransMilenio
- List of TransMilenio Stations
