= Quirigua (TransMilenio) =

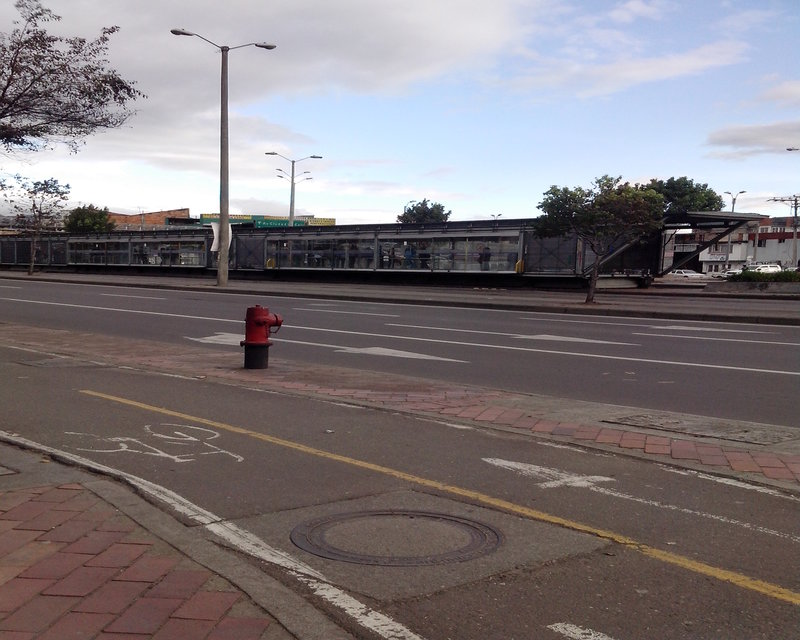

General information
- Location: Engativá; Colombia

History
- Opened: 2000

Services
Preceding station	TransMilenio	Following station
Carrera 90 towards Portal de la 80	D	Portal de la 80 towards Polo
Location

Quirigua is a station that is part of the TransMilenio mass-transit system of Bogotá, Colombia, which opened in the year 2000.

== Location ==
The station is located in northwestern Bogotá, specifically on Calle 80 with Carrera 94.

It receives its name from the neighborhood of the same name located to the north of the station. It also serves the neighborhoods of París Gaitán and Santa Rosita.

== History ==
In 2000, phase one of the TransMilenio system was opened between Portal de la 80 and Tercer Milenio, including this station.

== Station Services ==
=== Old trunk services ===
Services rendered until April 29, 2006
Kind	Routes	Frequency
Current		Every 3 minutes on average
Express	Expreso 30	Every 2 minutes on average
Express Dominical	Expreso Dominical 35	Every 3 or 4 minutes on average

=== Main Line Service ===
Service as of April 29, 2006
Type	Northern Routes	Southern Routes	Frequency
Local	6	6	Every three minutes
Express Monday through Saturday; All day	D21	H21	Every two minutes
Express Sundays and holidays	D95	J95	Every 3–4 minutes

=== Feeder routes ===
This station does not have connections to feeder routes.

=== Inter-city service ===
This station does not have inter-city service.

== See also ==
- Bogotá
- TransMilenio
- List of TransMilenio Stations
