= Polo Grounds (disambiguation) =

The Polo Grounds were three stadiums in Upper Manhattan, New York City.

Polo Grounds may also refer to:

- A polo field
- Polo Fields, a multi-purpose stadium in Golden Gate Park, San Francisco
- Polo Grounds Music, an American hip hop and R&B record label
- Polo Grounds, New Inn, a defunct sports ground and racing track in New Inn, South Wales
- Polo Ground in Kangla, a polo field in Imphal, India

== See also ==
- Polo (disambiguation)
