= Carrera 47 (TransMilenio) =

Transit station in Bogotá, Colombia

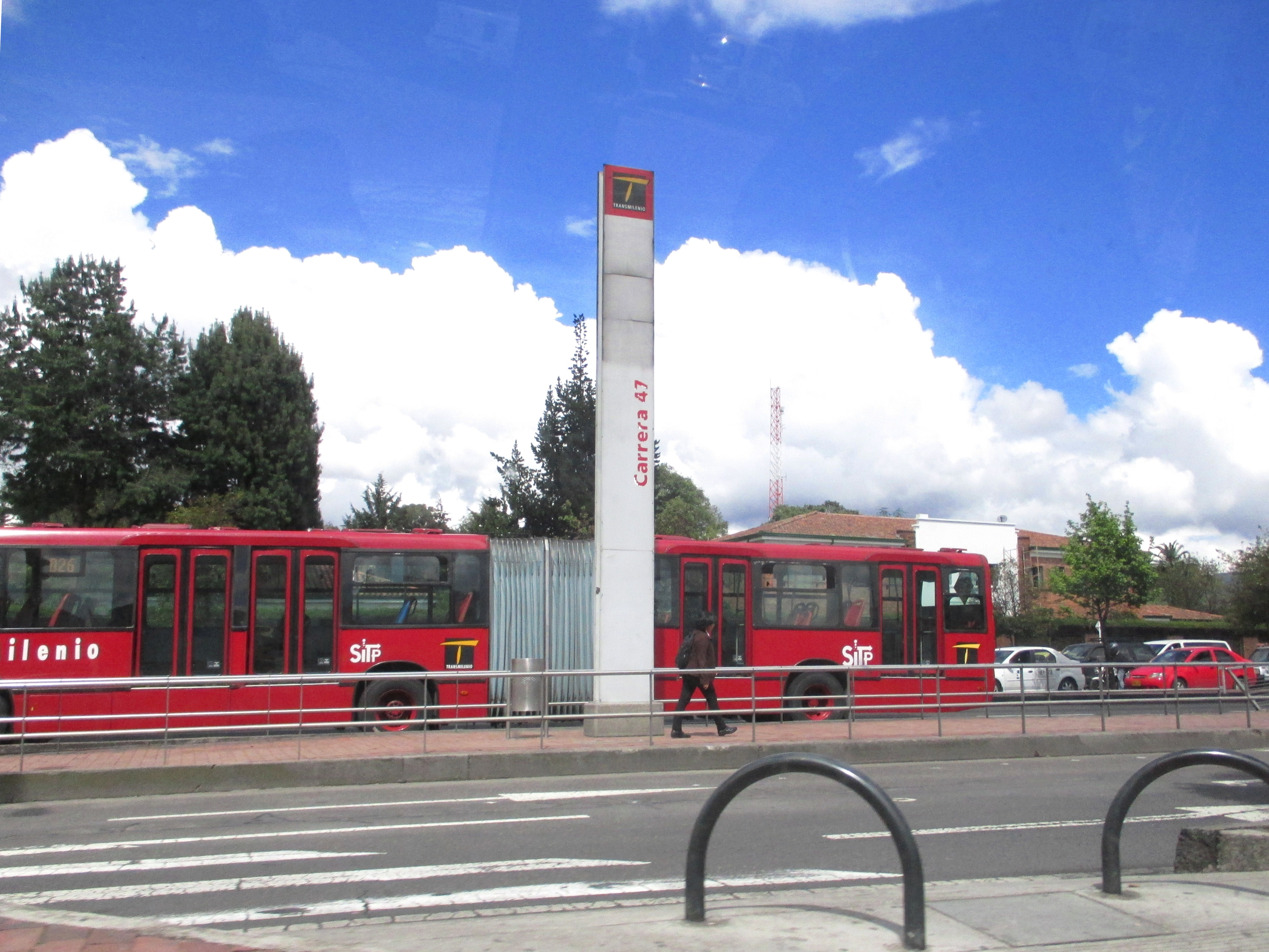

General information
- Location: Barrios Unidos; Colombia

History
- Opened: 2000

Services
Preceding station	TransMilenio	Following station
Escuela Militar towards Portal de la 80	D	Carrera 53 towards Polo

The simple station Carrera 47 is part of the TransMilenio mass-transit system of Bogotá, Colombia, opened in the year 2000.

== Location ==
The station is located in northwestern Bogotá, specifically on Calle 80 with Carrera 58.

It serves the Gaitán and Escuela de Cadetes (Cadets' school) neighborhoods.

The women's prison, El Buen Pastor, is located close to the station.

== History ==
In 2000, phase one of the TransMilenio system was opened between Portal de la 80 and Tercer Milenio, including this station.

The station is named Carrera 47 due to its location at the intersection of that road with Avenida Calle 80.

== Station Services ==
=== Old trunk services ===
Services rendered until April 29, 2006
Kind	Routes	Frequency
Current		Every 3 minutes on average

=== Main Line Service ===
Service as of April 29, 2006
Type	North or South Routes	Northwestern Routes	Frequency
Local	6	6	Every three minutes
Express Monday through Sunday; All Day	G22	D22	Every two minutes
Express Monday through Saturday; All Day	B10	D10	Every two minutes

=== Dual services ===
Services rendered since May 30, 2015
Kind	Routes to the North	Routes to the South
Dual Monday to Sunday all day	D81	M81

=== Feeder routes ===
This station does not have connections to feeder routes.

=== Inter-city service ===
This station does not have inter-city service.

== See also ==
- Bogotá
- TransMilenio
- List of TransMilenio Stations
