= Escuela Militar (TransMilenio) =

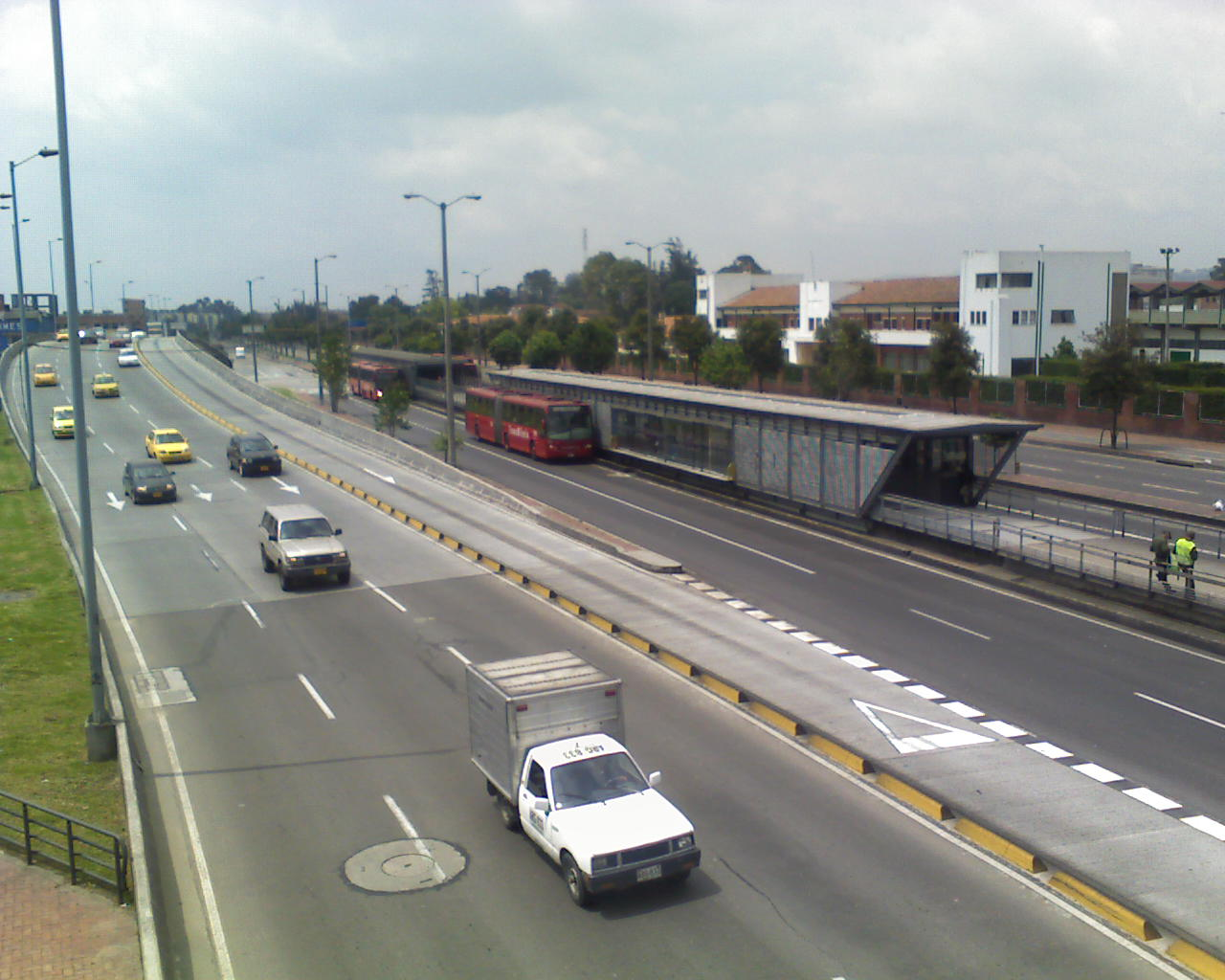

General information
- Location: Calle 80 with Carrera 51; Barrios Unidos; Colombia

History
- Opened: 2000

Services
Preceding station	TransMilenio	Following station
Carrera 47 towards Portal de la 80	D	Polo Terminus
San Martín towards Portal de Suba	C	Terminus
NQS Calle 75 towards La Castellana	E	Terminus
Location

The simple station Escuela Militar is part of the TransMilenio mass-transit system of Bogotá, Colombia, opened in the year 2000.

== Location ==
The station is located in northwestern Bogotá, specifically on Calle 80, with Carrera 51.

It serves the Gaitán and La Patria neighborhoods.

== History ==
In 2000, phase one of the TransMilenio system was opened between Portal de la 80 and Tercer Milenio, including this station.

The station is named Escuela Militar due to its location in front of the General José María Cordova military school.

The station is close to the major roads NQS and Avenida Suba. It serves as an interchange for passengers on the NQS, Suba, and Calle 80 lines of the system.

== Station Services ==
=== Old trunk services ===
Services rendered until April 29, 2006
Kind	Routes	Frequency
Current		Every 3 minutes on average
Express	Expreso 40 Expreso 90	Every 2 minutes on average

=== Main Line Service ===
Service as of April 29, 2006
Type	Northern Routes	Southern Routes	Frequency
Local	6	6	Every three minutes
Express Monday through Saturday; All day	B11 / C15 / D70	G11 / H15 / J24	Every two minutes
Express Monday through Friday; Morning rush	B56		Every two minutes
Express Sundays and holidays	C91 / D95	F91 / J95	Every 3–4 minutes

=== Feeder routes ===
This station does not have connections to feeder routes.

=== Inter-city service ===
This station does not have inter-city service.

== See also ==
- Bogotá
- TransMilenio
- List of TransMilenio Stations
