= Marco Polo (disambiguation) =

Marco Polo was a 13th-century Italian explorer.

Marco Polo may also refer to:

== People ==
- Marco Polo (producer) (born 1979), Canadian hip hop producer
- Marco Polo Del Nero (born 1941), Brazilian sports administrator
- Mark di Suvero (born Marco Polo di Suvero in 1933), sculptor

== Places ==
- Marco Polo (crater), on the Moon
- Marco Polo House, a now-demolished office building in London
- Marco Polo Park, a defunct 1970s theme park in Florida
- Venice Marco Polo Airport, an airport in Venice, Italy
- Marco Polo Bridge, southwest of Beijing, China
- The Marco Polo high-rise condominium, Honolulu, Hawaii, the site of a 2017 fire

== Media and entertainment ==
=== Film ===
- Marco Polo (1962 film), starring Rory Calhoun
- Marco Polo (2007 film), a TV film

=== Music ===
- Marco Polo Fest, a Croatian music festival
- Marco Polo (opera), 1996, by Tan Dun
- Marco Polo – The Journey, a 1992 album by Ensemble Renaissance
- Marco Polo, a 1998 EP by Blueboy
- "Marco Polo" (Bow Wow song), 2008
- "Marco Polo", a single by Loreena McKennitt from her album The Book of Secrets
- "Marco Polo", a 1981 song by Harry Sacksioni
- "The Marco Polo", a song by The Spinners

=== Television ===
- Marco Polo (Doctor Who), a 1964 television serial
- Marco Polo (1982 TV series), a 1982 American-Italian television mini-series
- Marco Polo (2014 TV series), a 2014 American Netflix drama
- "Marco Polo" (Modern Family), a television episode
- "Marco Polo" (The Sopranos), a television episode

== Space missions ==
- Marco Polo (spacecraft), a proposed asteroid mission
- Marcopolo, either of two 1980s communications satellites

== Transport ==
=== Ships ===
- Marco Polo (1851 ship), a clipper
- Marco Polo, former name of the Yugoslav and Montenegrin training ship Jadran
- CMA CGM Marco Polo, a container ship
- Italian cruiser Marco Polo, an 1890s warship
- MS Marco Polo, a cruise ship
- SS Marco Polo, a cargo ship later serving in World War II as the USS Mount Hood (AE-11)
- TS Marco Polo II, a proposed name of TS Maxim Gorkiy

=== Other ===
- Lamborghini Marco Polo, a car design
- Westfalia Marco Polo, a motorhome model
- Marcopolo S.A., a Brazilian bus manufacturer
  - Tata Marcopolo, Indian subsidiary
- Marco Polo Club, Cathay Pacic frequent flyer program

== Other uses ==
- Marco Polo (game), a swimming game
- Marco Polo (app), a video messaging and video hosting service
- Fronte Marco Polo, a Venetian political party
- Marco Polo Cycling Club, an online forum
- Marco Polo Cycling–Donckers Koffie, a former Hong Kong/Chinese/Ethiopian cycling team
- Marco Polo Hotels, based in Hong Kong
  - Marco Polo Ortigas Manila, Philippines
- The Marco Polo sheep of Central Asia

=== Marco Polo Junior ===
- Marco Polo, Junior, a 1929 juvenile novel by Harry A. Franck
- Marco Polo Junior Versus the Red Dragon, a 1972 Australian animated musical adventure film

== See also ==
- The Travels of Marco Polo, a book of stories by Marco Polo
- Marc O'Polo, a fashion label
- The Adventures of Marco Polo, a 1938 film directed by John Ford, starring Gary Cooper
- The Adventures of Marco Polo (1979 TV series), a Japanese anime TV series
- La pietra di Marco Polo, a 1982-1983 Italian television series
- Marco the Magnificent, also known as La fabuleuse aventure de Marco Polo, a 1965 film starring Horst Buchholz
- Marco Polo, If You Can, a 1982 novel by William F. Buckley
- The Marco Polo Bridge incident
- Colias marcopolo (C. marcopolo), a butterfly species
- Maurizio De Jorio (born 1968), Italian-American singer who has recorded as "Marko Polo"
