= Villas de Granada =

- Barrio
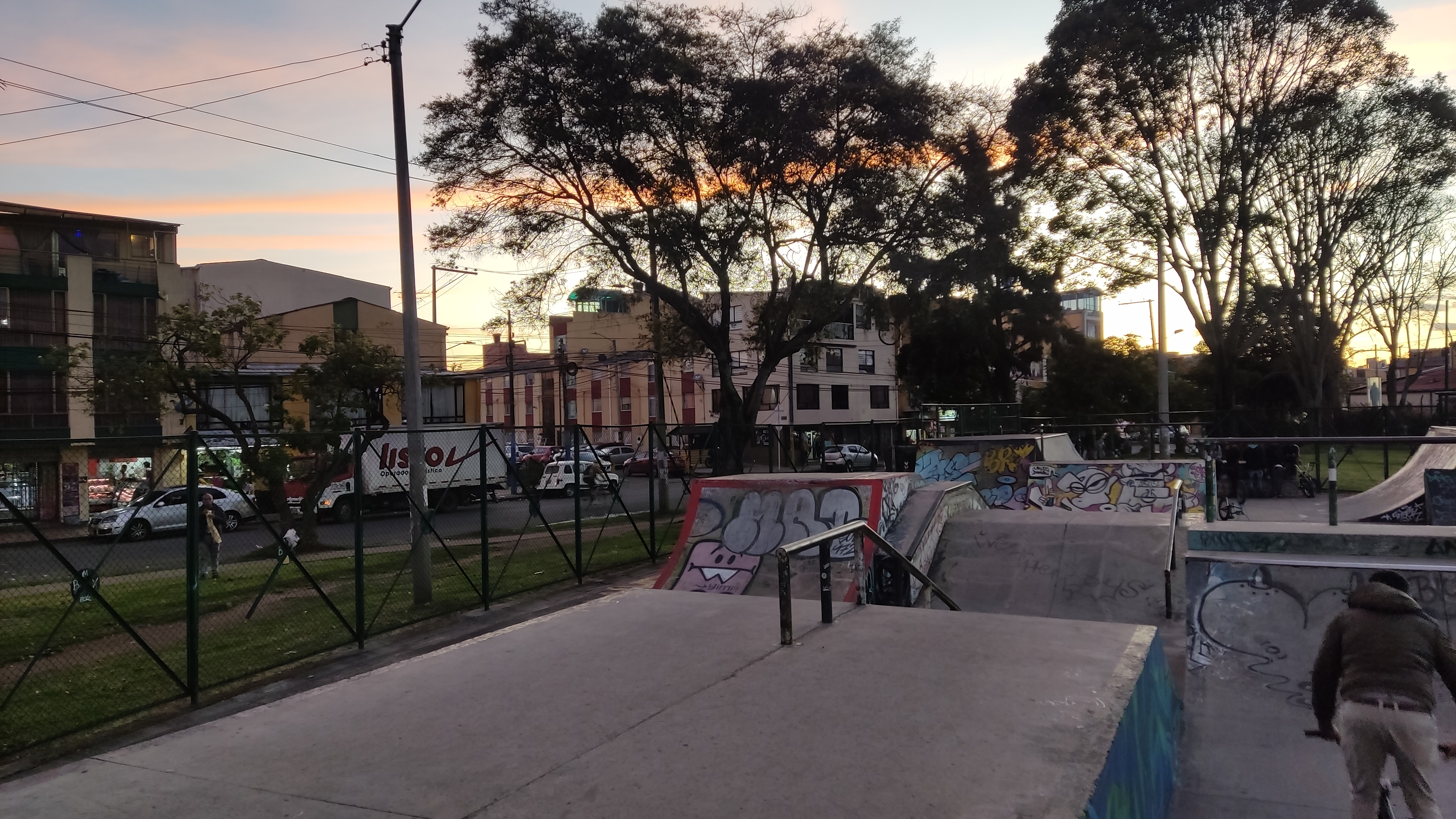
- Interactive map of Villas de Granada
- Country: Colombia
- Department: Distrito Capital
- City: Bogotá

Villas de Granada is a neighbourhood (barrio) located in the locality of Engativá in Bogotá, Colombia. It is located northwest of the city, bordering the neighborhoods of Garcés Navas, Ciudadela Colsubsidio and El Cortijo.
