= Polos (disambiguation) =

Polos generally refers to a high cylindrical crown typically worn by mythological goddesses.

Polos may also refer to:

- The plural of polo
- In music, the polos is one of the interlocking parts of Kotekan
