= ADOX =

German photography company

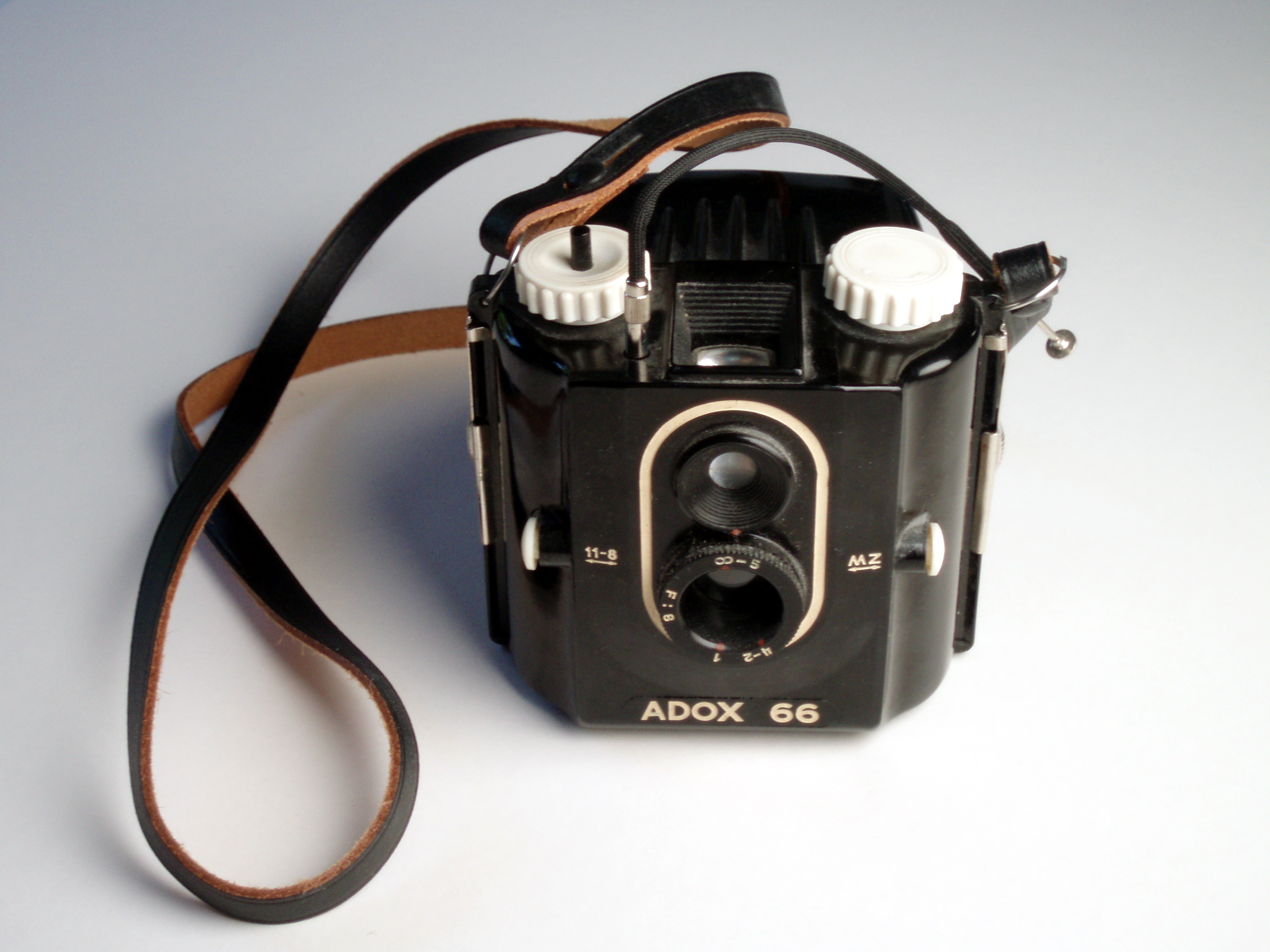
ADOX 66 camera (1950)

The ADOX brand for photographic purposes has been used by three different companies since its original conception over one hundred fifty years ago. ADOX was originally a brand name used by the German company, Fotowerke Dr. C. Schleussner GmbH of Frankfurt am Main, the world's first photographic materials manufacturer. In 1962 the Schleussner family sold its photographic holdings to DuPont, an American company. DuPont used the brand for its subsidiary, Sterling Diagnostic Imaging for X-ray films. In 1999, Sterling was bought by the German company Agfa. Agfa did not use the brand and allowed its registration to lapse in 2003. Fotoimpex of Berlin, Germany, a company founded in 1992 to import photographic films and papers from former eastern Europe immediately registered the brand and today ADOX is a brand of black and white films, photographic papers and photochemistry produced by ADOX Fotowerke GmbH based in Bad Saarow near Berlin.

== History ==
=== Fotowerke Dr. C. Schleussner GmbH (1860 - 1962) ===
ADOX was originally a brand name used by the German company, Fotowerke Dr. C. Schleussner GmbH of Frankfurt am Main, the world's first photographic materials manufacturer. The company's founder, Dr. Carl Schleussner, did pioneering work on the wet-collodion process during the early years of photography, and formed his manufacturing company in 1860. Working with the physicist Wilhelm Röntgen, discoverer of X-rays, Dr. Schleussner invented the first X-ray plate.

The Schleussner firm began marketing cameras under the ADOX brand name in the first third of the 20th century and, recognizing the growing importance of the brand, renamed itself "Adox Fotowerke Dr. C. Schleussner GmbH." In 1952 they introduced a line of very sharp black and white 35 mm films under the ADOX brand.

=== DuPont & Agfa (1962 - 2003) ===
In 1962, the Schleussner family sold its photographic holdings to DuPont, an American company. DuPont became owners of the trademark, and registered it in the United States.

In the 1970s, Dupont licensed the Adox film technology, but not the trademark, and sold the coating plant with 'dip and dunk' machinery of their film to Fotokemika, Samobor, Yugoslavia (now Croatia) in 1972 who continued to produce the traditional black and white films according to the 1950s ADOX formulas under the Efke brand. (See List of discontinued photographic films). The Efke black & white KB (135), R (120 and 127) and PL (sheet film) films in 3 speeds (ISO 25, 50 and 100) were noted for their wide-latitude, smooth grain, great tonality, incredible sharpness and being capable of high contrast results. In particular the slowest speed film KB 25 was laid down as a single layer emulsion. The films were low cost but due to their soft emulsion were prone to scratching during processing as well as quality issues.

DuPont kept the Adox trademark, transferring it to a subsidiary, Sterling Diagnostic Imaging, for its Adox brand X-ray films. DuPont still applies it to an industrial chemical, sodium chlorite.

In 1999, Sterling was bought by the German company Agfa, and was absorbed into Agfa's Health Sciences unit. In this roundabout way, the Adox photographic trademark once again briefly became German. Agfa did not use the Adox trademark, and the mark was removed from the German Patent Office trademark registry in March, 2003. It was almost immediately revived by companies in Canada, the United States, and Fotoimpex in Germany.

=== ADOX Fotowerke GmbH (2003 on) ===
The current rights to the ADOX name were obtained in 2003 by Fotoimpex of Berlin, Germany, a company founded in 1992 to import photographic films and papers from former eastern Europe. In particular they imported the Efke KB films and sold them branded as 'ADOX CHS Art' thus finally re-uniting the ADOX name with the original Schleussner film formula.

Fotoimpex established the ADOX Fotowerke GmbH film factory in Bad Saarow outside Berlin to convert and package their films, papers and chemicals using machinery acquired from the closed AGFA (Leverkusen, Germany) and Forte Photochemical Industry (Hungary) photographic plants.

ADOX test-produced a slightly improved version of the original AGFA APX 400 as ADOX Pan 400 during 2010.

After Fotokemika's closure in 2012 due to failure of the original film making machinery proving too expensive to repair, Fotoimpex had ADOX CHS 100 II (equivalent to Efke KB 100) black and white film produced using modern cascade coating. This took priority over proposals to re-introduce Agfa APX 400.

In February 2015 they purchased/obtained a long lease on the former Ilford Imaging, Switzerland (Ciba Geigy) machine E, medium scale coating line at Marly, Switzerland to coat photographic film and paper. Trial coating for ADOX CHS 100 (II) was undertaken at Marly prior to its re-introduction in 2018. The plant has also been used for testing the proposed revival of Polywarmtone Paper last produced by Forte in Hungary.

ADOX are also (2017-19) doubling the size of the film factory in Bad Saarow, Germany to add a small coating line using a former AGFA machine as well as space for small scale chemical production and film materials storage.

== Current Products ==
ADOX Fotowerke GmbH produces a range of black and white films, photographic paper and photochemistry. The company has notably resurrected former ADOX films and AGFA films, paper and chemicals including the entire Agfa B&W chemistry line with the help of its former employees and it now holds the trademark in Europe and USA for the famous (Agfa) Rodinal film developer. It also sells newer more 'eco-friendly products'. Chemistry is produced in house in their factory.

=== Films ===
- CMS 20 II – ISO 12/12°. An Agfa-Gevaert orthopanchromatic micro film converted by ADOX offering very high resolution, needing special developer to tame contrast for normal pictures. Format: 135, 120, sheet film
- CHS 100 II – ISO 100/21°. The original ADOX R/KB21 film (Efke KB 100 to 2012) classic 1950s ortho-panchromatic B&W print film. Introduced 2013 as a modern coating on a polyester base, but sold out by 2016. It was not re-introduced until 2018, initially as sheet film. Format: 135, 120, sheet film
- HR-50 – ISO 50/18°. Super-panchromatic ultra fine grain – Agfa-Gevaert Aviphot 80 modified to enhance usability. May also be used as an infra-red film with suitable filtration. Introduced 2018. Format: 135
- IR-HR Pro – ISO 80/20°. Super-panchromatic fine grain film – Agfa-Gevaert Aviphot 80 as HR-50 without modification. Initial trial batch introduced 2018. Format: 135 (discontinued)
- Silvermax – ISO 100/21°. Panchromatic B&W print film on a triacetate base (Similar to the original Agfa APX 100). Format: 135 (discontinued)
- Scala 50 – ISO 50/18°. Panchromatic B&W reversal film based on HR-50. Format: 135
- Scala 160 – ISO 160/23°. Panchromatic B&W reversal film (Same film as Silvermax). Format: 135 (discontinued)
- Color Mission 200 – ISO 200/24°. New color negative film developed by ADOX. Format: 135

=== Photographic Paper ===
- MCC 110 – Fibre based glossy paper (As for Agfa Multicontrast Classic) emulsion made using original Agfa machinery.
- MCC 112 – Fibre based semi-matte paper (As for Agfa Multicontrast Classic) emulsion made using original Agfa machinery.
- MCP 310 – Premium resin coated (RC) glossy photopaper with outstanding image quality (As for Agfa Multicontrast Premium) emulsion made using original Agfa machinery. Currently discontinued due to high costs of production.
- MCP 312 – Premium resin coated (RC) semi-matte photopaper with outstanding image quality (As for Agfa Multicontrast Premium) emulsion made using original Agfa machinery. Currently discontinued due to high costs of production.
- Lupex – A slow speed contact fibre based paper made with a silver chloride emulsion and replaces Kodak Azo or Fomalux.
- Fine Print Variotone – A newly developed warmtone paper made in cooperation with Harman Technology and Wolfgang Moersch. (discontinued)
- Color Mission RA-4 – Color photopaper cut from genuine master rolls of a large manufacturer by ADOX in Bad Saarow.

=== Other Photographic Paper ===
- Art Baryta – Pure uncoated baryta base for coating with liquid emulsions.
- Fibre Baryta – Inkjet paper using fibre-base from analog photo paper manufacturing (100% alphacellulose with a barium-sulfate coating) and is coated with an inkjet receiving layer plus a backside coating to minimize curling behavior.
- Fibre Monojet – An inkjet media optimized for the reproduction of black and white images.

=== Film Developers ===
- Rodinal / Adonal – Liquid concentrate developer dating from 1891 and produced according to Agfa Leverkusen's latest Rodinal formula from 2004.
- Atomal 49 – Powder based universal ultra-finegrain developer for all types of B&W materials with good speed utilisation and high compensating factor. (Development of Agfa Atomal with currently available chemistry)
- D-76 Classic – Powder developer with extended shelf life equivalent to Kodak D-76.
- D-76 Eco – D-76 formula with borates replaced by non-toxic biodegradable buffer.
- XT-3 – A two-part powder developer equivalent to Kodak Xtol.
- HC-110 Pro – Highly concentrated developer equivalent to Kodak HC-110.
- FX-39 II – Geoffry Crawley's FX-39 was a development of Willi Beutler's formula for Neofin Red.
- HR-DEV – Curve optimizing developer particularly well suited for the ADOX HR-50.
- Adotech IV – Liquid concentrate developer for ADOX CMS 20 II films.
- Silvermax Developer – Specially formulated to increase tonal range in the Silvermax 21 film, formulated by SPUR.
- Scala Kit – Kit for processing Scala black and white reversal films.
- C-TEC C-41 Kit – Liquid concentrate kit for development of C-41 color negative films based on Tetenal Colortec C-41.
- C-TEC E-6 Kit – Liquid concentrate kit for development of E-6 color reversal films based on Tetenal Colortec E-6.

=== Paper Developers ===
- Neutol NE – Liquid concentrate neutral black working paper developer. Former Agfa developer.
- Neutol WA – Liquid concentrate warm tone paper developer. Former Agfa developer.
- Neutol Eco – Liquid concentrate without hydroquinone based on ascorbic acid.
- MCC Developer – Liquid concentrate fine art developer for multigrade papers for neutral-black image tones. Former Agfa developer.
- Adotol Konstant – Powder developer, which produces a neutral-black image tone based on ORWO N 113.
- RA-4 Kit – Liquid concentrate color paper developer kit.

=== Other Chemicals ===
- Adostop Eco – (2018) Liquid concentrate 100% citric acid based odourless stop bath.
- Adostop Eco P – Powdered odourless stop bath.
- Acetic Acid 60% – 60% Acetic acid liquid concentrate for stop baths.
- EHM-1 – Concentrated emulsion hardener.
- Adofix Plus – Liquid concentrate, high capacity express-fixer with maximum capacity for black and white photo papers (RC and fibre), films and photographic plates.
- Adofix P II – Powdered acidic universal fixer.
- Thio-Clear Eco – Liquid concentrate for eliminating sodium/ammonium thiosulfate from film and paper emulsions.
- Adoflo – Highly concentrated liquid wetting agent. (discontinued)
- Adoflo II – Highly concentrated liquid wetting agent.
- Adostab – Liquid concentrate, image stabilizer and wetting agent. (discontinued)
- Adostab II – Liquid concentrate image stabilizer and wetting agent similar to Agfa Sistan.
- Selentoner – Selenium toner for black and white photomaterials (films or paper).

== Discontinued Products ==
Produced by ADOX Fotowerke Dr. C. Schleussner GmbH.

=== Cameras ===
135 format

- Adrette, name variant of the Wirgin Edinex
- Adox 300
- Adox 500, prototypes
- Golf I (1964)
- Golf IA
- Golf IIA
- Golf IIIA
- ADOX Polo
- Polo 1S
- Polomat
- Polomatic

6×6 Box

- ADOX 66
- Adox Blitz

6×6 Folding

- Golf I
- Golf II
- Golf IV
- Mess-Golf I
- Mess-Golf II
- Mess-Golf IV
- Golf 63 (1954–59)
- Golf 63 S
- Golf 45 S

6×9

- Adox Sport (6×9 + 6×4.5)
- Adox Start (1950)

=== Films ===
- ADOX KB 14 / R 14 – (1952-1973) Ortho-panchromatic B&W print film
- ADOX KB 17 / R 17 / PL 17 – (1952-1973) Ortho-panchromatic B&W print film
- ADOX KB 21 / R 21 / PL 21 – (1952-1973) Panchromatic B&W print film
- ADOX R 25 – (?) Fast Panchromatic B&W print film
- ADOX KB 27 / R 27 – (?-1973) High speed panchromatic B&W print film
- ADOX NC 17 – (?) Color negative film
- ADOX C 15 – (1958) Color reversal film
- ADOX C 18 – (?) Color reversal film replacing C 15

== See also ==
- List of photographic films
- List of discontinued photographic films

== Sources ==
The text of this article has been adapted with permission from information published at Adox Fotowerke, Inc.
