= San Polo (disambiguation) =

San Polo is a sestiere (district) of Venice, Italy.

San Polo may also refer to other places in Italy:

- San Polo (church), a Catholic church for which the Venice sestiere is named
- San Polo, a frazione of Brescia, Lombardy
  - San Polo (Brescia Metro), a railway station
- San Polo, a frazione and municipal seat of Torrile, in the Province of Parma, Emilia-Romagna
- San Polo dei Cavalieri, a municipality in the Province of Rome, Lazio
- San Polo d'Enza, a municipality in the Province of Reggio Emilia, Emilia-Romagna
- San Polo di Piave, a municipality in the Province of Treviso, Veneto
- San Polo Matese, a municipality in the Province of Campobasso, Molise

== See also ==
- Polo (disambiguation)
- San (disambiguation)
