= Efke =

Croatian photography supplies brand

- Maker: Fotokemika
- Speed: 25/15°, 50/18°, 100/21°, 200/24°, 400/27°
- Type: B&W ,photographic paper, Infrared film, color film and reversal film
- Process: Gelatin-silver, C-41 process and E-6 process
- Format: 35 mm, 120, 127, sheet film (various sizes)

Efke is the brand name of photographic films, papers, and chemicals that were manufactured by Fotokemika Zagreb d.d., a company located in Samobor, Croatia.

== Products description ==
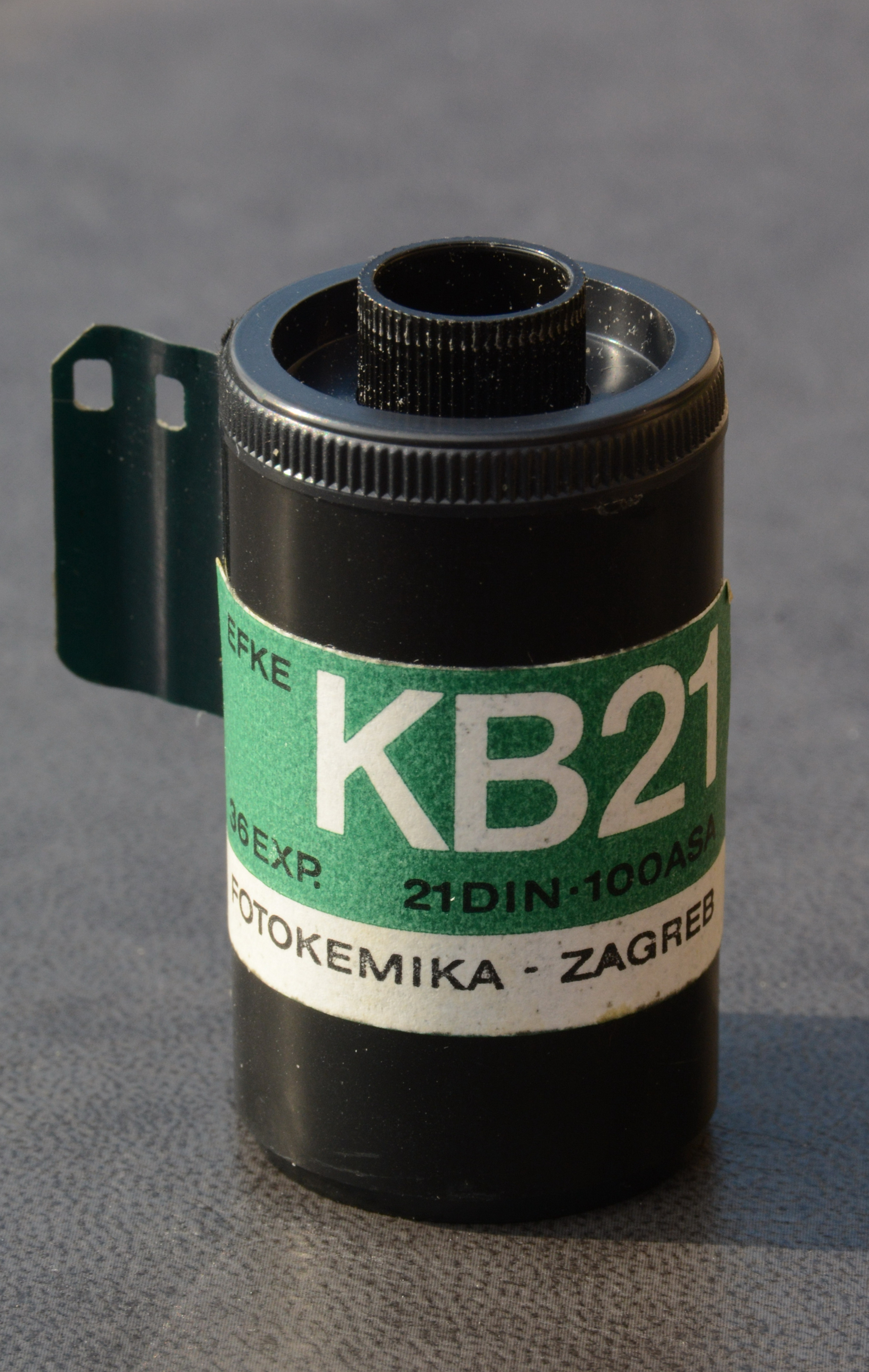
EFKE KB21 Black & white film

The Efke films are black-and-white films with high silver content and as a result give a large exposure latitude and high quality grayscale reproduction when compared with modern films. The Efke 25, 50 and 100 products were made using the ADOX formulas that were first introduced in the 1950s.

Efke also made an infrared film sold as Efke IR820, a color film branded as "efkecolor" in ISO speeds of 100/400 (1986–1992), spektar 100/200/400 (~1992-2009) and HG100 (~1996-?) as well as a 100 ISO color reversal film called "efkechrome" (1982–1999).

Color Efke films are very rare and information is almost impossible to find due to the color film being discontinued rather quickly compared to Efke's other product lines.

The black and white Efke films are more forgiving of exposure variations than modern tabular crystal films. The nature of the product also allows large, grain free, enlargements to be made from negatives.

Efke black and white films were coated in one layer, unlike most other films which are coated in multiple layers. This makes the film thinner and the emulsion more easily damaged, especially when still wet after development. A hardening fixer can be used to help protect the emulsion. The film base is also thinner and more transparent, making inspection of the negative easier. However it can also make the film curl more easily.

Efke was the only manufacturer making 127 format film between 1995, when Kodak discontinued the format, and 2006, when a Canadian company also began making 127.

Efke's Infrared Film, sold under the brand name Efke IR820 was the only infrared film manufactured that has good IR sensitivity beyond 750 nm extending out to 820 nm. In the past other films such as Kodak's HIE offered this but have recently been discontinued and are no longer made.

== Closing ==
Fotokemika ceased all production on 30 August 2012.

As a result of the breakup of Yugoslavia in the 1990s and the subsequent privatization process of the company, its equipment and Real Estate were sold to western companies and many of its workers laid off during the 90s and 2000s, which ultimately led the company to its bankruptcy.

For a short while after its closing the company existed as a distributor of medical films and materials made by other manufacturers.

== Legacy ==
There have been efforts to save the Fotokemika heritage.

In late 2020 Croatian photographer Silvester Kolbas organized an exhibition about efke, the company Fotokemika Zagreb d.d and its heritage at the Museum of Technology "Nikola Tesla", Zagreb, called "Fotokemika" showcasing old equipment and products, that were left behind in the abandoned factory facilities of Fotokemika Zagreb d.d, as well as photos taken with expired efke black and white film.
