= Polo (given name) =

Polo is a masculine given name and nickname. Notable people with the name include:

== Given name ==
- Polo Piatti, British-Argentine composer, concert pianist and conductor
- Polo Reyes, Mexican mixed martial artist
- Polo Villaamil (born 1979), Spanish auto racing driver
- Polo Wila (born 1987), Ecuadorian footballer

== Nickname ==
- Polo (comedian) (1962-2024), Indonesian comedian and actor
- Polo Barnes, American jazz clarinetist and saxophonist
- Polo Carrera (born 1945), Ecuadorian footballer
- Polo Hofer (1945–2017), Swiss musician
- Polo Lombardo, Panamanian footballer
- Polo Montañez, Cuban singer and songwriter
- Polo Morín, Mexican actor and model
- Polo Quinteros, Argentine footballer
- Polo Ravales, Filipino actor and model
- Polo Urías, Mexican singer-songwriter
- Polo Welfring, Luxembourgish gymnast
- Polo Zuliani (died after 1410), Venetian nobleman, statesman, and Duke-elect of Candia
