= Marco Polo Park =

Theme park in Florida, US, 1970–1976

Marco Polo Park (also known as Passport to Fun World) was a theme park located just west of Interstate 95 between Jacksonville and Daytona Beach near Bunnell, at what is now Exit 278 in Flagler County, Florida on the site of the current Plantation Bay Golf and Country Club community. The park's theme was based on Marco Polo's legendary travels through Europe and the Far East. The brochure provided at the park's entrance gave this description: "Like Marco Polo himself, you will be wonderstruck at the authentic Oriental splendor of your personal voyage of discovery as you journey into the exotic four worlds of the Far East, Turkey, India, China, Japan and beautiful Venice, your port of embarkation." The park featured rides, puppet shows, multimedia shows, and other attractions.

== History ==
The park was first envisioned in 1967 as a novel family recreation center. The central feature was to be a 12-story cylindrical building "as long as a football field". Dubbed "The Climatron", it was to contain horticultural exhibits from regions as diverse as the Arctic and the Equator, with each display occupying a floor climatically simulating the native environment of the plants. The glass walls of the building would be hidden by trees, plants, flowers and a 90-foot (27 m) high waterfall. From the roof, visitors would be able to look down upon a variety of exhibits including a Japanese garden, a Black Forest garden, a storybook forest, a grand bazaar and various scientific laboratories. Opening day was proposed for autumn 1968. The Climatron was never built.

The first phase of the park was completed and opened December 28, 1970. The Japanese gardens covered about 500 of the park's 5,000 acres (20 km^{2}). It included a replica of a Japanese fishing village, a Japanese botanical garden and a mile long waterway spanned by oriental bridges. Eighteen sampans, made of teakwood imported from Japan, carried visitors along the waterway. Two restaurants served tempura-style dishes. There were also a number of souvenir shops which sold a variety of Japanese-themed items. A year's admission to the park cost $2 for adults and $1 for children until April 1, 1971, when the cost for adults was raised to $2.50. The park opened to considerable fanfare but it was never profitable. An expansion in May 1972 forced a shutdown of the park with the addition of a petting zoo and lands themed to Venice, China, India and Turkey.

In early 1974, a local hotel owner from Daytona Beach, "Jack" White, commissioned Michael Jenkins to redesign the Japanese Village into a themed amusement park like Six Flags Over Texas which he had designed earlier in his career. He hired Paul Osborne & Assc. to create the "Kubla Kan!" puppet show, while subcontracting the addition of rides and shows. The tar walkways through the park were still being poured the day before the grand opening. The park enjoyed mediocre success but was plagued by financial difficulties which led to several park sub-contractors leaving with their equipment before the lawsuits began.

The park closed in October 1974, and in February 1975 two fires ravaged the property just eight days apart. Arson was suspected because the fire started in the Japanese Village at the same time that an unknown person shot twice at the security guard. The park briefly reopened on May 24, 1975, as "Passport to Fun World", keeping the world travel theme. The Japanese Village, having borne the brunt of the fires, was completely razed and a bandstand with an American theme was constructed in its place. A 40-horse carousel was added. The park closed permanently in 1976 and the remaining equipment was sold at auction on March 14, 1978. No structures from the former park remain.

The road crossing I-95 leading to the park's former entrance, once renamed "Marco Polo Park Boulevard", reverted to its original name of "Old Dixie Highway". The community of Plantation Bay now occupies the site of the former park.

One major hindrance to the park's success was the lack of a southbound exit off of Interstate 95 to access the park. People traveling south on I-95 to Daytona Beach and the Titusville/Cocoa/Kennedy Space Center area, or southwest to Orlando, Walt Disney World, or the Tampa and St. Petersburg/Clearwater area via I-95 to Interstate 4, had to either go to the next exit and return, a trip of several miles, or leave the beach area and come back. Many preferred to simply go on to Daytona Beach or Orlando. Overhyping was a problem as well. In Daytona Beach and other parts of northern, northeastern and central Florida, television commercials for the park promised "the greatest adventure of your life." The park provided almost 100 jobs for young people for the two summers of its heyday, but it never became the major attraction that developers hoped for.

The park undoubtedly suffered from the opening of Walt Disney World near Orlando in October 1971, after which it was a difficult sell getting people to stop at a lesser attraction along the way to the Disney theme park.

== Lands and rides ==
An overhead suspended gondola system linked various parts of the park.

=== Venice ===
The entrances to the ticket booths and into the park were through an elaborate Venetian-style entrance arch.

A 24-inch narrow gauge railroad, with a four-car steam train named "The Orient Express," traveled the 1 1/3 mile perimeter of the park.

Replica Model Ts moved along a guided track through the woods.

=== Turkey ===
A Flying Chairs Ride

A "Spinning Turban" centrifuge ride

Twin Bumper Cars Rides (one adult, one child)

=== India ===
Log Flume

Flying Elephant Ride

=== China ===
Spinning Tea Cup Ride

=== Japan ===
An 82-foot-high Ferris wheel with 24 spinning gondolas

== Song ==
Some commercials for the attraction featured a jingle which alluded to the common "Marco Polo" swimming version of "Blind Man's Bluff":

Get into the swim,
The place to begin,
At Marco Polo Park.

There's things to do
For me and you
At Marco Polo Park.

It's fun for you and me,
And it's made for you and me.
It's Marco Polo, Marco Polo, Marco Polo Park.

So, get into the swim,
The place to begin,
At Marco Polo, Marco Polo, Marco Polo Park.

== See also ==
- Climatron, an enclosed greenhouse built in 1960 in St. Louis, Missouri
