= Normandía, Bogotá =

Normandía
- Barrio
- Country: Colombia
- Department: Distrito Capital
- City: Bogotá

Normandía is a neighbourhood (barrio) of Bogotá, Colombia.
