= Polo Grounds, New Inn =

- Interactive map of Polo Grounds, New Inn
- Location: New Inn, near Pontypool, Torfaen, south Wales
- Coordinates: 51°41′29″N 3°0′49″W

The Polo Grounds, Pontypool Road was a sports ground and former greyhound racing track in New Inn, near Pontypool, Torfaen, south Wales.

The Polo Ground in the village of New Inn (known previously as Pontypool Road on old maps) was situated off the west side of the High Way (modern day Highway) and the northern side of New Road. The grounds were used for coursing and pony races and was home to the Wanderers Polo team at the end of the 19th century. The local schools of New Inn, Pontymoile, Griffithstown and Sebastopol used the Polo Ground before the second world war as did the Pontypool Road Cricket Club. In the 1920s and 1930s Pontypool Hockey Club and Pontypool Road Association Football Club also used the site.

During the second world war the grounds were used to house soldiers. This accommodation was later used as New Inn Camp 677 to house German and Italian prisoners of war (PoW).

Greyhound racing began in the 1930s with four race meetings per week. The greyhound track was referred to as Pontypool Road as was the village for a time due to the rail station being close to the grounds. The greyhound racing was independent (unaffiliated to a governing body). In the 1947 betting licence lists the track was able to accommodate a capacity of 10,000 people. The exact finishing date of the greyhound racing is not known but the track is not listed in the betting licence lists after 1947.

In the mid-1970s Chad Valley moved their soft toy manufacturing to a factory on the Polo Grounds and the industrial units now there are on the Chad Valley Site, Polo Grounds.
