= ADOX Polo =

Camera manufactured between 1960 and 1963

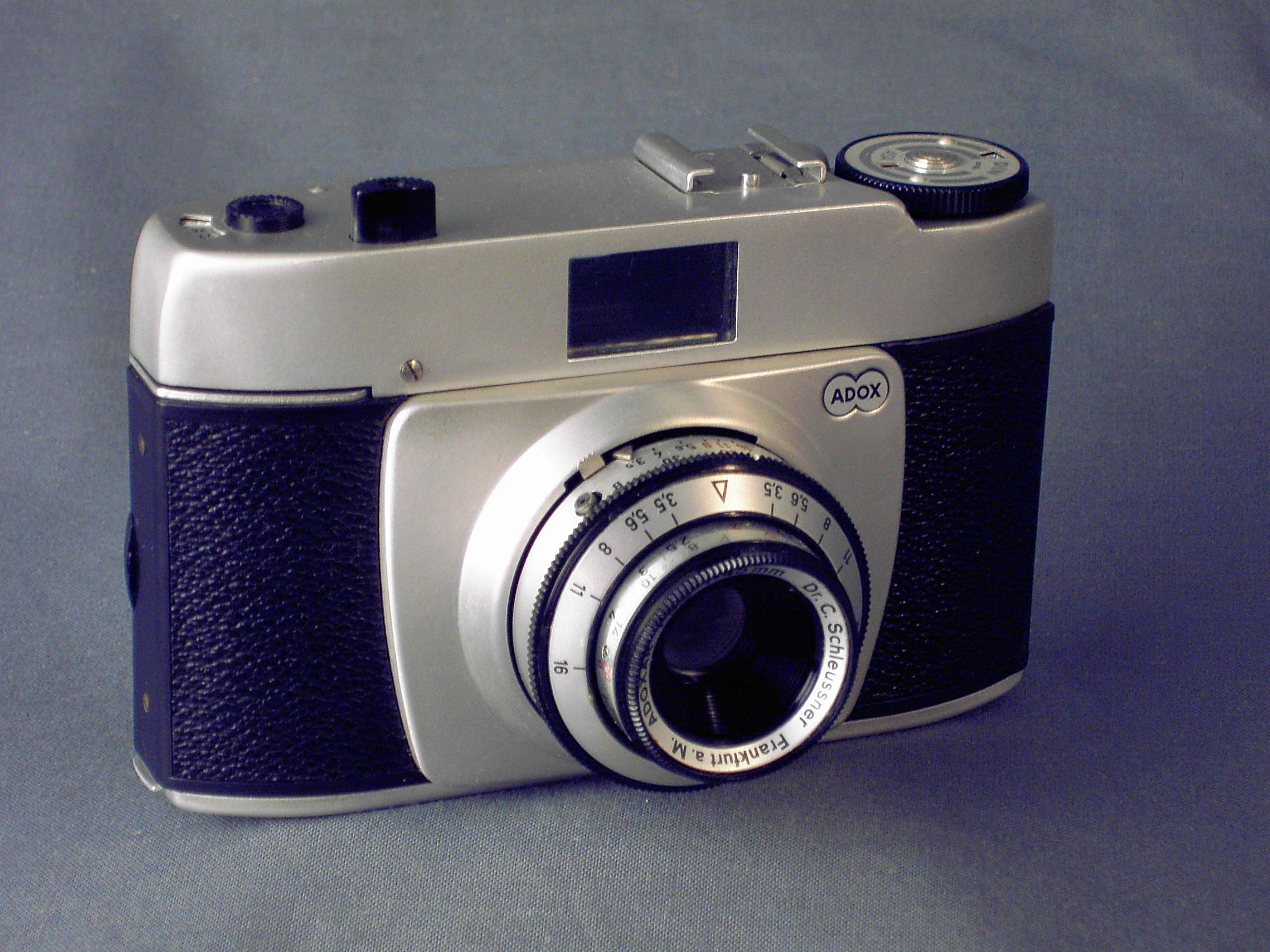

Overview
- Maker: Fotowerke Dr. C. Schleussner GmbH
- Type: 35 mm SLR

Lens
- Lens: Adoxar 45mm f/3,5

Sensor/medium
- Film speed: ASA 8 to 800 [manual]

Focusing
- Focus: Manual

Exposure/metering
- Exposure: Manual
- Exposure metering: none

Flash
- Flash: PC socket
- Flash synchronization: 1/30 s

Shutter
- Frame rate: Manual lever winding
- Shutter speed range: B, 1/30, 1/60 and 1/125 s [mechanical]

General
- Battery: none
- Dimensions: 130 × 86 × 67 mm
- Weight: 280 g
- Made in: Germany

The ADOX Polo was a consumer-class, viewfinder camera with a completely manual operating system. It was manufactured between 1960 and 1963. Dr C. Schleussner Fotowerke GmbH was installed during WW2 in the stolen Wirgin camera factory of Wiesbaden, Germany. The three Wirgin brothers who were the founders and owners of the Wirgin company, were forced to leave Germany when the Nazis seized their factory before the Holocaust and installed ADOX. After the war, the Wirgin brothers returned to Germany, reclaimed their factory and continued business producing the Edixa and subsequent models.

== Description ==
ADOX produced high-resolution fine-grained film material. The camera featured an Adoxar 45mm f/3,5 lens that would have been respectable on cameras in a much higher price range.

The top, bottom and the lens base cover were made from pressed steel of about ½mm thickness. The rest of the chassis and most of the internal parts were made from mould-injected plastic. Metal was only used for parts where wear and tear make it unavoidable, such as the film pressure plate and the film transport cogwheels.

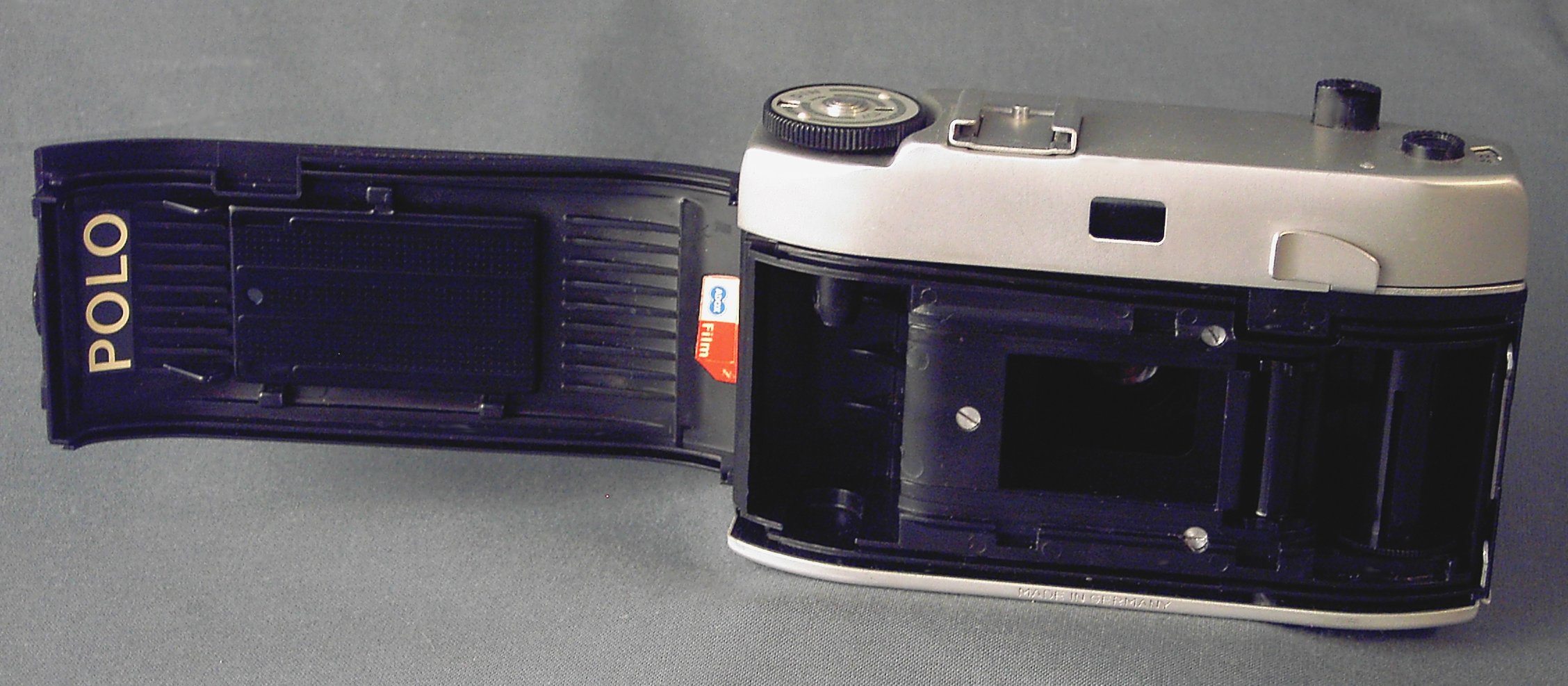
Interior

The viewfinder had neither lines for parallax compensation, nor for outlining the edge of the negative. With the camera held to take a picture in landscape format, the center mounting and poor enlargement of the viewfinder required the user to press the nose rather hard against the camera back. There was no rangefinder.

The camera had no light meter. It offered three shutter speeds and aperture values had to be set by a separate light meter, by guesswork or by following the coarse exposure guide on the film package.

An accessory shoe was on the top of the housing but without a 'hot-shoe' contact. The rewind knob held a film speed reminder, covering ASA 8-800/DIN 10–30, but no folding rewind handle. The frame counter needed to be reset manually. It counted down from the number of exposures in the roll to zero.
