= Polo (surname) =

Polo is an Italian and Spanish surname, the most well-known bearing the name being Italian trader and explorer Marco Polo (1254–1324). Other notable people with the surname include:

- Niccolò and Maffeo Polo (1230–1294 and 1230–1309 respectively), Marco Polo's father and uncle respectively
- Aldo Polo (born 1983), Mexican footballer
- Ana María Polo (born 1959), Cuban-American lawyer and Hispanic television arbitrator
- Andy Polo (born 1994), Peruvian footballer
- Armando Polo (born 1990), Panamanian footballer
- Asier Polo (born 1971), Spanish cellist
- Bernardo Polo (died c. 1700), Spanish painter
- Carmen Polo (1900–1988), wife of Francisco Franco and a member of the Spanish nobility
- Danny Polo (1901–1949), American jazz clarinetist
- Dean Polo (born 1986), Australian rules footballer
- Diego Polo the Elder (1560–1600), Spanish Renaissance painter
- Diego Polo the Younger (1620–1655), Spanish Baroque painter, nephew of the above
- Eddie Polo (1875–1961), Austro-American actor of the silent era born Edward W. Wyman or Weimer
- Enrico Polo (1868–1953), Italian violinist, composer and pedagogue
- Gaspar Gil Polo (1530?–1591), Spanish novelist and poet
- Joe Polo (born 1982), American curler
- Leonardo Polo (1926–2013), Spanish philosopher
- Malvina Polo (1903–2000), American actress, daughter of Eddie Polo
- Roberto Polo (born 1980), Colombian footballer
- Saul Polo, Canadian politician
- Teri Polo (born 1969), American actress
- Tom Polo (born 1965), Australian artist

== See also ==
- Alejandro Zaera-Polo (born 1963), Spanish architect and dean of the School of Architecture at Princeton University
