= Marco Polo Cycling Club =

- Website type: Social networking website
- Available in: English, Dutch Forum
- Owner: Marco Polo Cycling
- Website: www.marcopolocyclingclub.com
- Registration: Open
- Launched: December, 2010
- Current status: Active

The Marco Polo Cycling Club was founded in December 2000 by Nathan Dahlberg, Anno Pedersen, Gudo Kramer and Remko Kramer. It was named after the most famous traveller in history, Marco Polo. the Chinese/Japanese characters on the blue team-clothing mean: “Fight with the firm conviction of victory”.

The selection of the best Elite-riders joined together in the Marco Polo Cycling Team. In the Marco Polo Cycling Team cyclists from non-traditional cycling countries became a chance to show their talent. Cyclists from more than 20 nationalities have been part of the team. The team won the overall victory in more than 10 UCI international stage races and hundreds of top classifications, stages and one-day events.

The collective mission of all Marco Polo Cycling projects is to support the development of cycling in ‘non-traditional cycling countries’. The team provides a platform for talented riders, the club brings people from all over the world together and the foundation Bike4All by Marco Polo Cycling is working on development aid projects in and through cycling.

The Marco Polo Cycling Club was the first real Internet cycling club worldwide. However the focus was on building the team and improving the cycling aid projects in development countries, the Marco Polo Cycling Club Internet community had grown to 2000 members from 92 countries in 2006. But in that year the Internet community was stopped for various reasons.

In 2010 The Marco Polo Cycling Club came back online. After more than 4 years absence of an online home, the Internet cycling club returned with a new website. In 2010 Marco Polo Cycling is also celebrating its 10th anniversary and is making a closer connection between its members and fans and the continental team with Chinese registration, Marco Polo Cycling Team. Also the connection between the club members and the foundation Bike4All by Marco Polo Cycling that is working on development aid projects in and through cycling (now active in Ethiopia) is re-established, with a contribution to Bike4All for every item of team gear sold.
