= Ciudadela Colsubsidio =

- Barrio
- Country: Colombia
- Department: Distrito Capital
- City: Bogotá

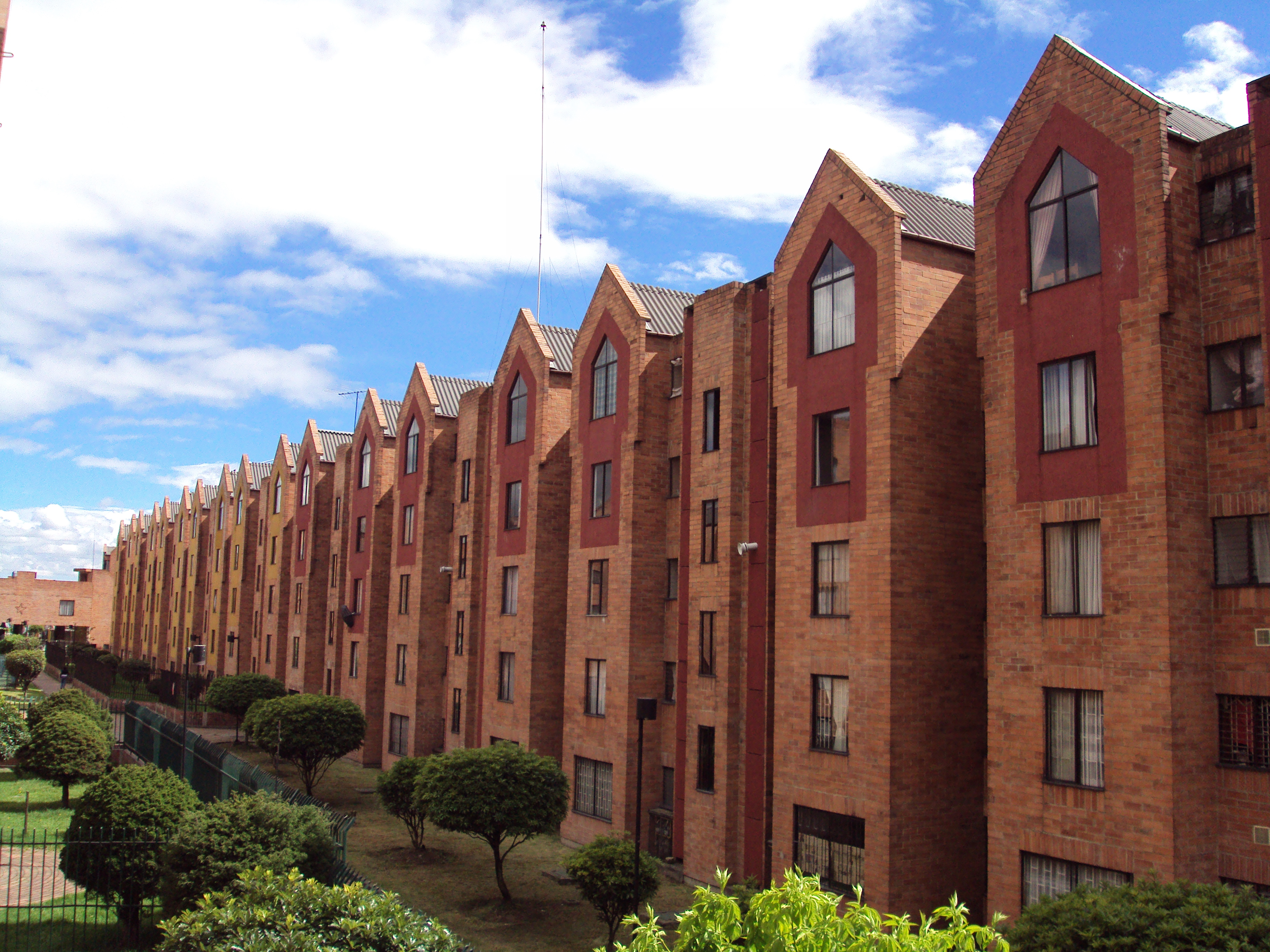
Row houses in Ciudadela Colsubsidio

Ciudadela Colsubsidio is a neighbourhood (barrio) of Bogotá, Colombia.
