= Engativá =

- Locality of Bogotá
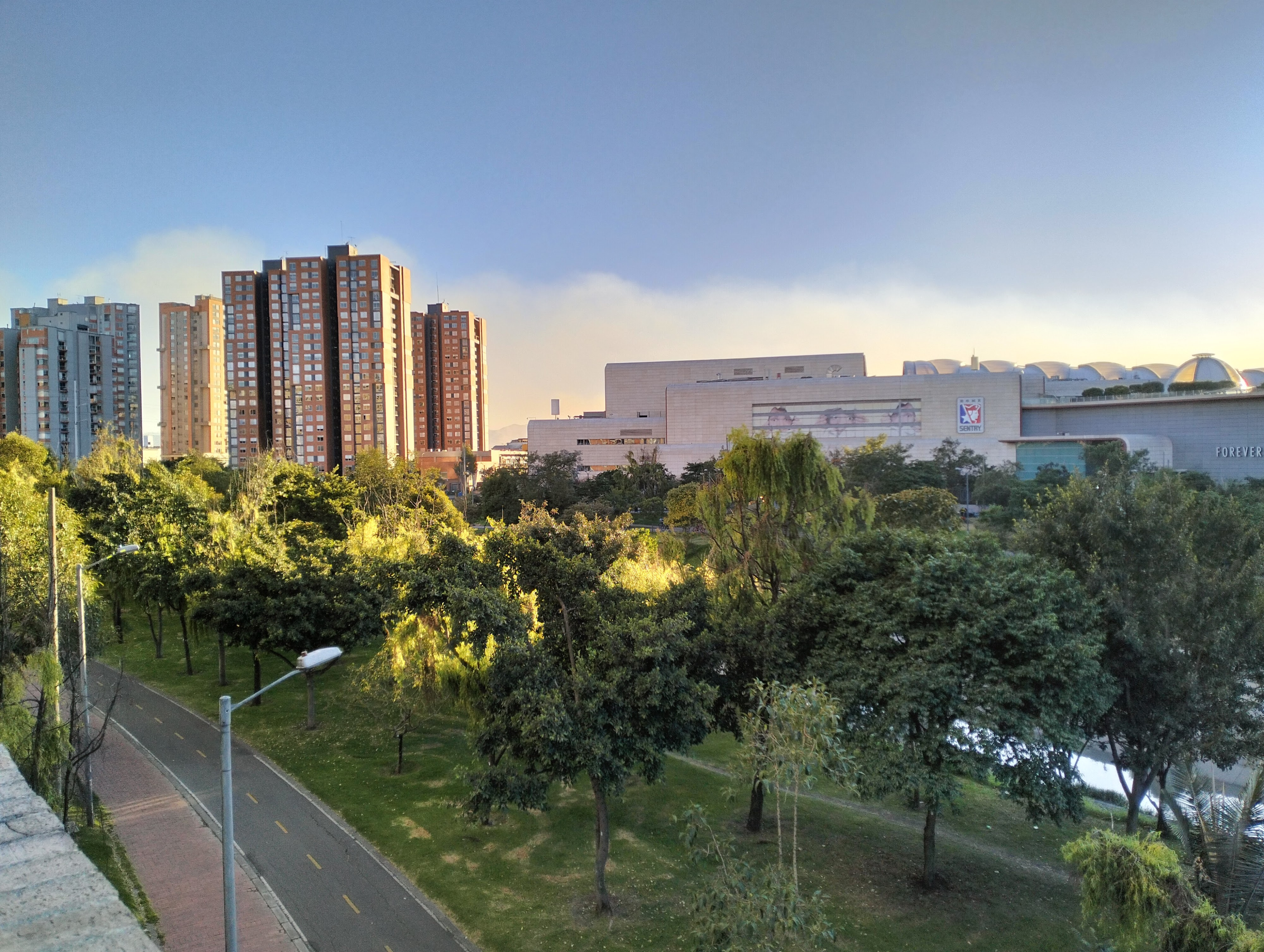

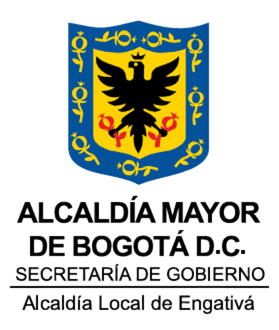
- Coat of arms

- Location of the locality in the city of Bogotá

- Location of the locality in the Capital District of Bogotá
- Coordinates: 4°43′34″N 74°06′00″W
- Country: Colombia
- City: Bogotá D.C.
- Neighbourhoods: List: Ciudadela Colsubsidio; Normandía (Bogotá); Villas de Granada

Area
  - Total: 35.88 km^{2} (13.85 sq mi)
- Elevation: 2,600 m (8,500 ft)

Population (2007)
  - Total: 824,337
  - Density: 22,970/km^{2} (59,500/sq mi)
- Time zone: UTC-5 (Colombia Standard Time)
- Website: Official website

Engativá is the 10th locality (localidad) of Bogotá, the capital city of Colombia. located in the city’s west‑northwest sector, Originally an independent municipality of the Department of Cundinamarca, Engativá was annexed to Bogotá in 1954, forming part of the city’s expansion.

Its territory is a mix of predominantly residential neighborhoods, commercial areas, industrial zones, and a lot of rural-like spaces used for agriculture and green zones.

It lies at an average elevation of around 2,600 meters (about 8,500 ft) above sea level.

== Etymology ==
Engativá is derived from Inga-tivá; Inga: "Land of the Sun or Land of the West", Tivá: Cacique.

== Geography ==
Engativá is limited to the north by the Salitre River with Suba, to the east by Avenida Carrera 68 and Bosa, to the south by Avenida El Dorado and Fontibón, and to the west by the Bogotá River.

== History ==
Engativá was a village in the confederation of the Muisca. Modern Engativá was founded in 1537. It has become a rural territory, people used to work as farmers of Bogotá in 1571. The church of the town was built in honor of the pope Clemente XII in 1638 and from 1737 it was named the Nuestra Señora de los Dolores's Sanctuary. The church was destroyed by earthquakes, but was rebuilt in 1960.
