= Portal de la 80 (TransMilenio) =

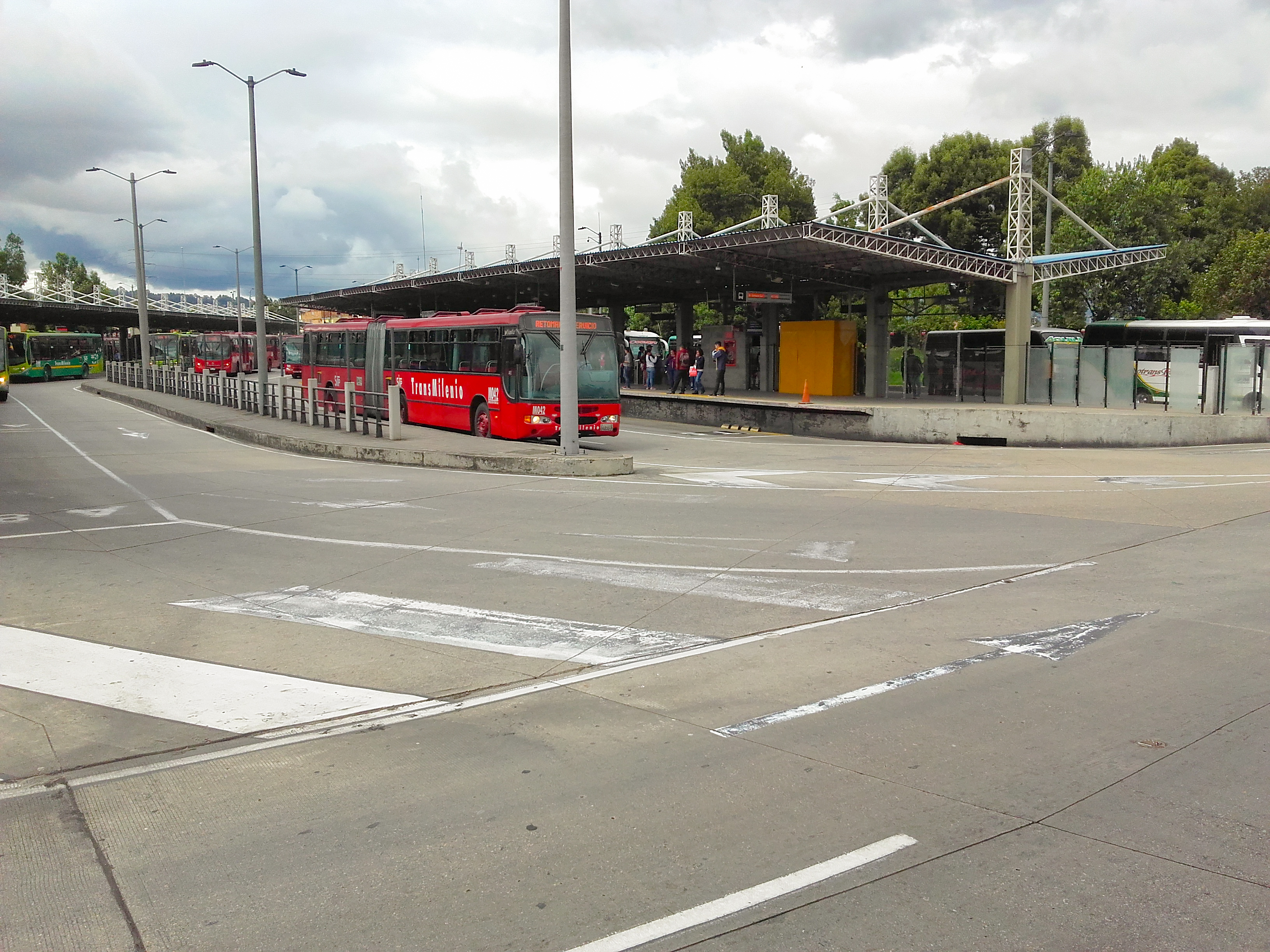

General information
- Location: Calle 80 with Avenida Longitudinal de Occidente (Carrera 96A); Engativá; Colombia

History
- Opened: December 17, 2000

Services
Preceding station	TransMilenio	Following station
Terminus	D	Quirigua towards Polo

The Portal de la 80 is one of the terminus stations of the TransMilenio mass-transit system of Bogotá, Colombia, opened in the year 2000.

== Location ==
The station is located in the north-west of the city, specifically at the intersection of Calle 80 with the future Avenida Longitudinal de Occidente (carrera 96A).

== History ==
On December 17, 2000, Portal de la 80 was opened as the first terminus station on the TransMilenio.

It services the neighborhoods of Álamos Norte, Luis Carlos Galán, and Bochicha. It also serves as a juncture for 10 feeder routes and inter-city connections.

The station is located next to the large shopping center by the same name. Also in the area are a large park and Engativá Hospital.

== Station services ==
=== Old trunk services ===
Services rendered until April 29, 2006
Kind	Routes	Frequency
Current		Every 3 minutes on average
Express	Expreso 10 Expreso 20 Expreso 30 Expreso 40 Expreso 80 Expreso 90 Expreso 140	Every 2 minutes on average
Super Express	Expreso 201 Expreso 301	Every 2 minutes on average
Express Dominical	Expreso Dominical 15 Expreso Dominical 35	Every 3 or 4 minutes on average

=== Trunk services ===
Services rendered since April 27, 2015
Kind	Routes to the North	Routes to the South	Routes to the East	Routes to the West
Local		6		
Expressed every day all day		G22		
Express Monday to Saturday all day	B10	H20 H21	J24	
Express Monday to Friday peak rush hour	B55			
Express Monday to Friday afternoon peak hour				F62
Express on Sundays and holidays	B94		J95	
Routes that finish in this station
Easy route	6			
Express every day all day	D22			
Express Monday to Saturday all day	D10 D20 D21 D24			
Express Monday to Friday morning rush hour	D50 D51			
Express on Sundays and holidays	D94 D95			

=== Feeder routes ===
The station receives the following feeder routes:

- Route 1.1 Álamos Norte loop
- Route 1.2 Garcés Navas loop
- Route 1.3 Villas de Granada loop
- Route 1.4 El Cortijo loop
- Route 1.5 Ciudadela Colsubsidio loop
- Route 1.6 Bolivia Oriental loop
- Route 1.7 Quirigua loop
- Route 1.8 Calle 80
- Route 1.9 Villas del Dorado loop
- Route 1.10 Bolivia / Bochicha II loop

=== Intercity services ===
Portal de la 80 is also the juncture point for buses between neighboring municipalities, such as Chía, Mosquera, Madrid, and Facatativá.

== See also ==
- Bogotá
- TransMilenio
- List of TransMilenio Stations
