= Polo (TransMilenio) =

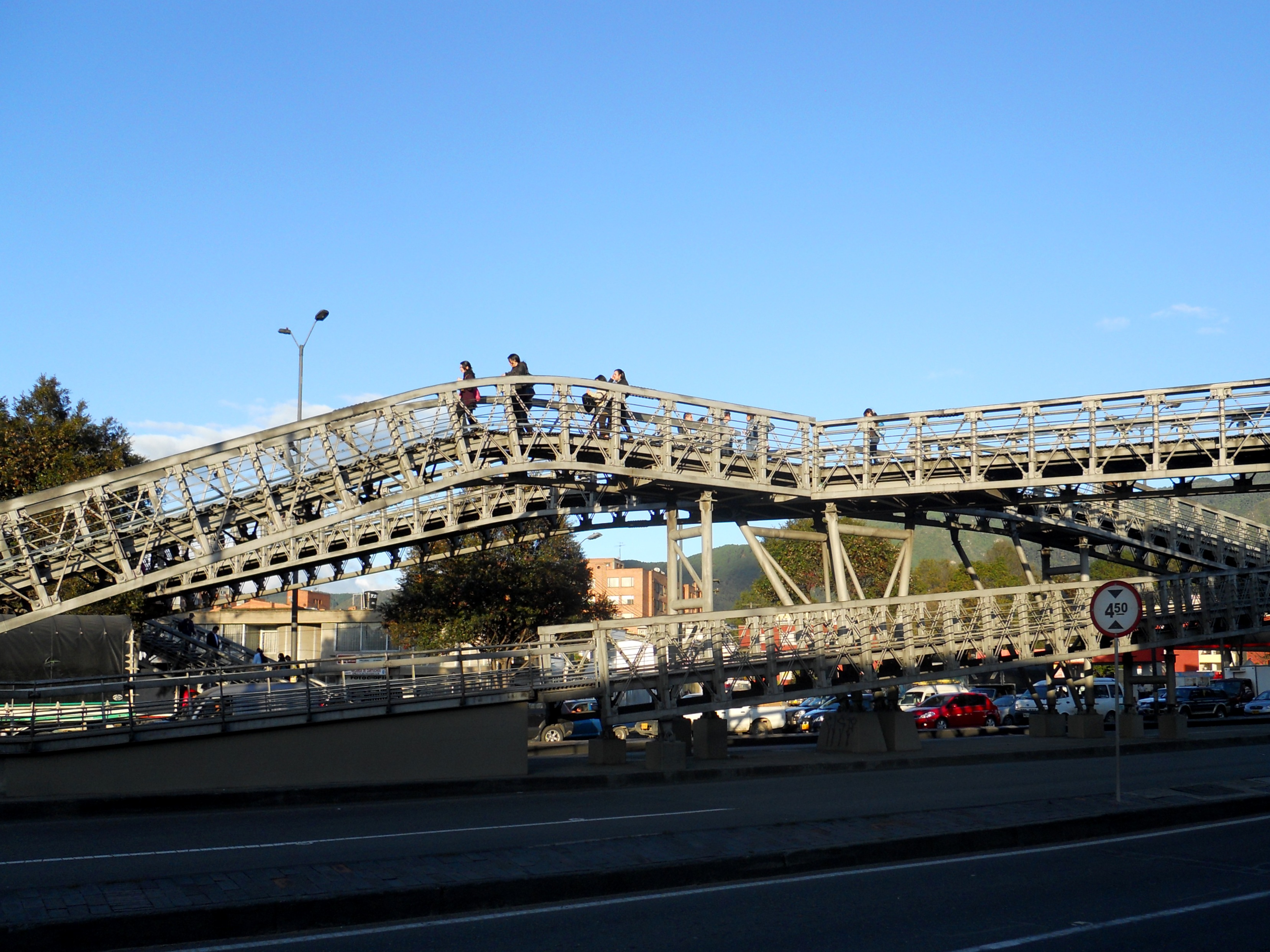

General information
- Location: Calle 80 with Carrera 27; Barrios Unidos; Colombia

History
- Opened: 2000

Services
Preceding station	TransMilenio	Following station
Escuela Militar towards Portal de la 80	D	Calle 76 towards Polo
Escuela Militar towards Calle 76	A	Calle 76 towards Tercer Milenio
Héroes towards Terminal	B	Terminus

The simple station Polo is part of the TransMilenio mass-transit system of Bogotá, Colombia, opened in the year 2000.

== Location ==
The station is located in northwestern Bogotá, specifically on Calle 80, with Carrera 27.

It serves the Juan XXIII, Alcázares Norte, and Santa Sofía neighborhoods.

== History ==
In 2000, phase one of the TransMilenio system was opened between Portal de la 80 and Tercer Milenio, including this station.

The station is named Polo due to its proximity to the neighborhood of the same name located to its north. The neighborhood, in turn, is named for the Polo Club field located within its boundaries.

== Station services ==
=== Old trunk services ===
Services rendered until April 29, 2006
Kind	Routes	Frequency
Current		Every 3 minutes on average
Express	Expreso 40 Expreso 90	Every 2 minutes on average

=== Current Trunk Services ===
Service as of April 29, 2006
Type	Northern Routes	Southern Routes	Frequency
All days	4 / 6	4 / 6	Every FIVE minutes
Express Monday through Saturday; All day	D20 / D24	H20 / J24	Every two minutes
Express Saturday; All day	C17	H17	Every two minutes
Express Monday through Friday; Mixed service, rush and non-rush	C17	H17	Every two minutes

=== Feeder routes ===
This station does not have connections to feeder routes.

=== Inter-city service ===
This station does not have inter-city service.

== See also ==
- Bogotá
- TransMilenio
- List of TransMilenio Stations
