= Sevillana (TransMilenio) =

Bus stop in Bogotá, Colombia

General information
- Location: Kennedy (Bogotá); Colombia

History
- Opened: April 15, 2006

Services
Preceding station	TransMilenio	Following station
Venecia towards Comuneros	G	Centro Comercial Paseo Villa del Río - Madelena towards San Mateo
Location

The simple station Sevillana is part of the TransMilenio mass-transit system of Bogotá, Colombia, opened in the year 2000.

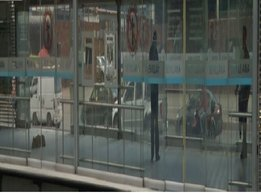
Sevillana (TransMilenio)

== Location ==
The station is located in southern Bogotá, specifically on Autopista Sur with Carrera 58, three blocks from Avenida Boyacá.

== History ==
This station was opened April 15, 2006 as part of the section between the stations General Santander and Portal del Sur of the NQS line.

The station is named Sevillana due to its proximity to the factory of that name that is located at the intersection of Autopista Sur with Avenida Boyacá.

The day March 9, 2012, protests lodged by mostly young children, repeatedly blocked in the trunk NQS. The protests left destroyed part of the system this season.

== Station services ==
=== Old trunk services ===
Services rendered until April 29, 2006
Kind	Routes	Frequency
Current		Every 3 minutes on average

=== Main line service ===
Service as of April 29, 2006
Type	Routes to the North	Routes to the East	Routes to the South
Local	4		4
Express Every Day; All day	D22	M47	G22 G47

=== Feeder routes ===
This station does not have connections to feeder routes.

=== Inter-city service ===
This station does not have inter-city service.

== See also ==
- Bogotá
- TransMilenio
- List of TransMilenio stations
