= Venecia (TransMilenio) =

Bus stop in Bogotá, Colombia

General information
- Location: Tunjuelito, Bogotá; Colombia

History
- Opened: 15 April 2006

Services
Preceding station	TransMilenio	Following station
Alquería towards Comuneros	G	Sevillana towards San Mateo
Location

The simple station Venecia is part of the TransMilenio mass-transit system of Bogotá, Colombia, opened in the year 2000.

== Location ==
The station is located in southern Bogotá, specifically on Autopista Sur with Carrera 54A. It serves the Venecia and Fatima neighborhoods.

== History ==
This station was opened April 15, 2006 as part of the section between the stations General Santander and Portal del Sur of the NQS line. The station is named Venecia due to the neighborhood of the same name that lies to the south.

== Station Services ==
=== Old trunk services ===
Services rendered until April 29, 2006
Kind	Routes	Frequency
Current		Every 3 minutes on average

=== Main line service ===
Service as of April 29, 2006
Type	Routes to the North	Routes to the East	Routes to the South	Routes to the West
Local	4		4	
Express Every Day; All day			G43	K43
Express Monday to Saturday; All day	B11		G11	
Express Monday to Friday; All day	C30		C30	
Express Monday to Friday; Morning rush hour		A52		
Express Monday to Friday; Afternoon rush hour			G52	
Express Saturday from 5:00 a.m. to 3:00 p.m.	C30		C30	

=== Feeder routes ===
This station does not have connections to feeder routes.

=== Inter-city service ===
This station does not have inter-city service.

== See also ==
- Bogotá
- TransMilenio
- List of TransMilenio stations
