= Centro Comercial Paseo Villa del Río - Madelena (TransMilenio) =

Bus stop in Bogotá, Colombia

Coordinates: 4°35′46.734″N 74°9′21.647″W

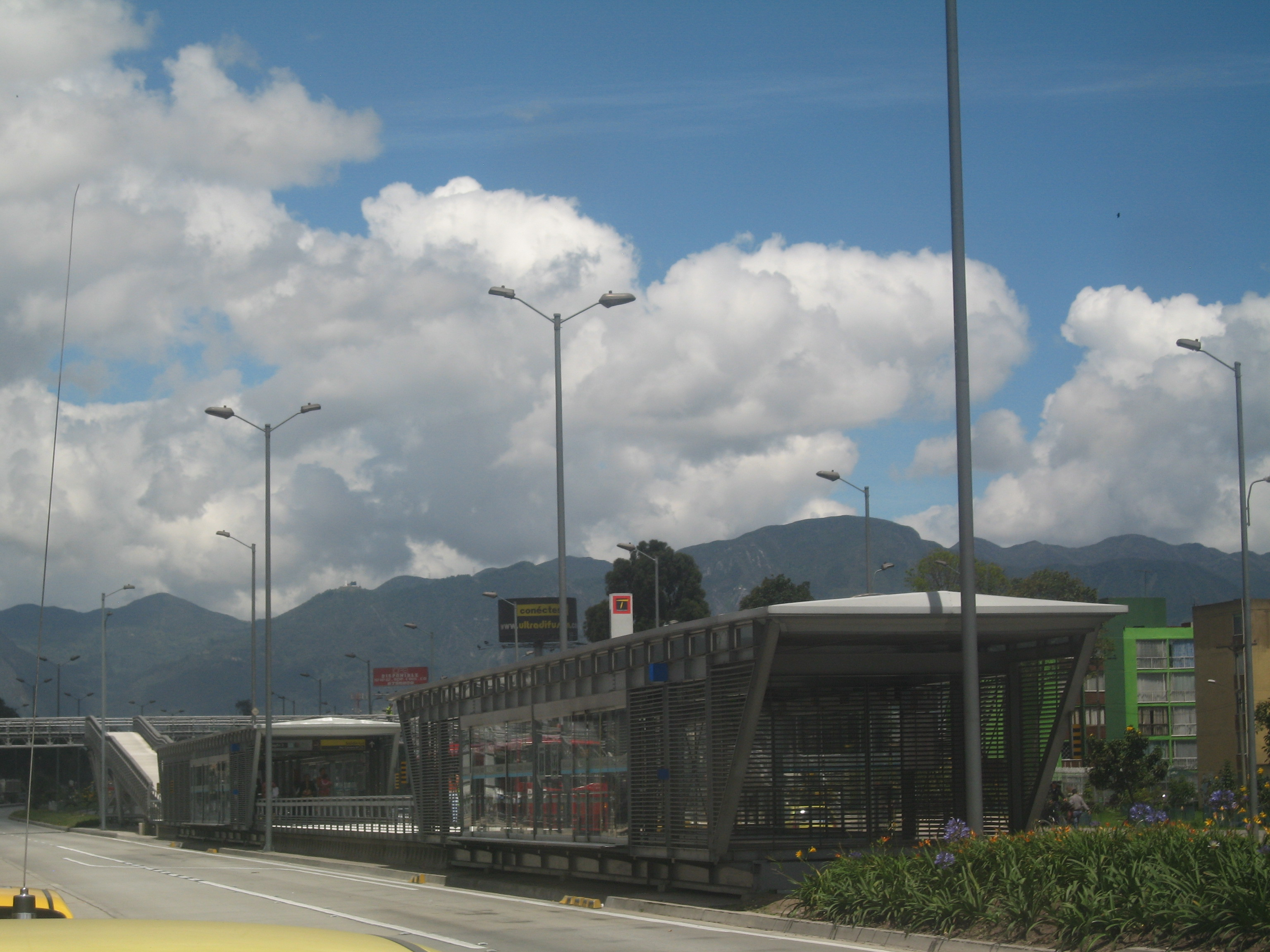

General information
- Location: Bosa (Bogotá); Colombia

History
- Opened: April 15, 2006

Services
Preceding station	TransMilenio	Following station
Sevillana towards Comuneros	G	Perdomo towards San Mateo
Location

The simple station Centro Comercial Paseo Villa del Río - Madelena is part of the TransMilenio mass-transit system of Bogotá, Colombia, opened in 2000.

== Location ==
The station is located in southern Bogotá, specifically on Autopista Sur with Carrera 64B. It serves the Olarte and Villa del Río neighborhoods, as well as the Makro store on Autopista Sur.

== History ==
The station was opened on April 15, 2006, as part of the section between the General Santander and Portal del Sur stations of the NQS line. It is named Centro Comercial Paseo Villa del Río - Madelena due to its proximity to the area of the same name.

== Station Services ==
=== Old trunk services ===
Services until April 29, 2006
Kind	Routes	Frequency
Current		Every 3 minutes on average
Express	Expreso 150	Every 2 minutes on average

=== Main line service ===
Service from April 29, 2006
Type	Routes to the north	Routes to the east	Routes to the south
Local	4		4
Express (daily); All day		M47	G47
Express (Monday to Saturday); All day	B11		G11
Express (Monday to Friday); Morning rush hour		A52	
Express (Monday to Friday); Afternoon rush hour			G52

Complementary services
The following complementary route also runs:

- 22.5 to the Centro Comercial Paseo Villa del Río - Madelena neighborhood. (temporarily suspended)

=== Inter-city service ===
There is no inter-city service.

== See also ==
- List of TransMilenio stations
