= Perdomo (TransMilenio) =

Railway station in Bosa, Bogotá, Colombia

General information
- Location: Bosa (Bogotá); Colombia

History
- Opened: April 15, 2006

Services
Preceding station	TransMilenio	Following station
Centro Comercial Paseo Villa del Río - Madelena towards Comuneros	G	Portal del Sur towards San Mateo
Location

The simple railway station at Perdomo is part of the TransMilenio mass-transit system of Bogotá, Colombia, opened in the year 2000.

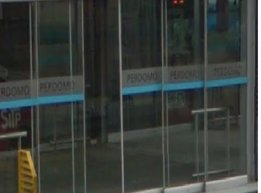
Perdomo (TransMilenio)

== Location ==
The station is located in southern Bogotá, specifically on Autopista Sur with Carrera 71. It is two blocks from Avenida Ciudad de Villavicencio.

== History ==
This station was opened April 15, 2006 as part of the section between the stations General Santander and Portal del Sur of the NQS line.

The station is named Perdomo due to the nearby area known as Ismael Perdomo.

== Station services ==
=== Old trunk services ===
Services rendered until April 29, 2006
Kind	Routes	Frequency
Current		Every 3 minutes on average
Express	Expreso 150	Every 2 minutes on average

=== Main line service ===
Service as of July 23, 2012
Type	Routes to the North	Routes to the East	Routes to the South
Local	4		4
Express Every Day; All day	B12	M47	G12 G47
Express Monday to Friday; Morning rush hour		A52	
Express Monday to Friday; Afternoon rush hour			G52

=== Feeder routes ===
This station does not have connections to feeder routes.

=== Inter-city service ===
This station does not have inter-city service.

== See also ==
- Bogotá
- TransMilenio
- List of TransMilenio stations
