= La Despensa (TransMilenio) =

TransMilenio stop

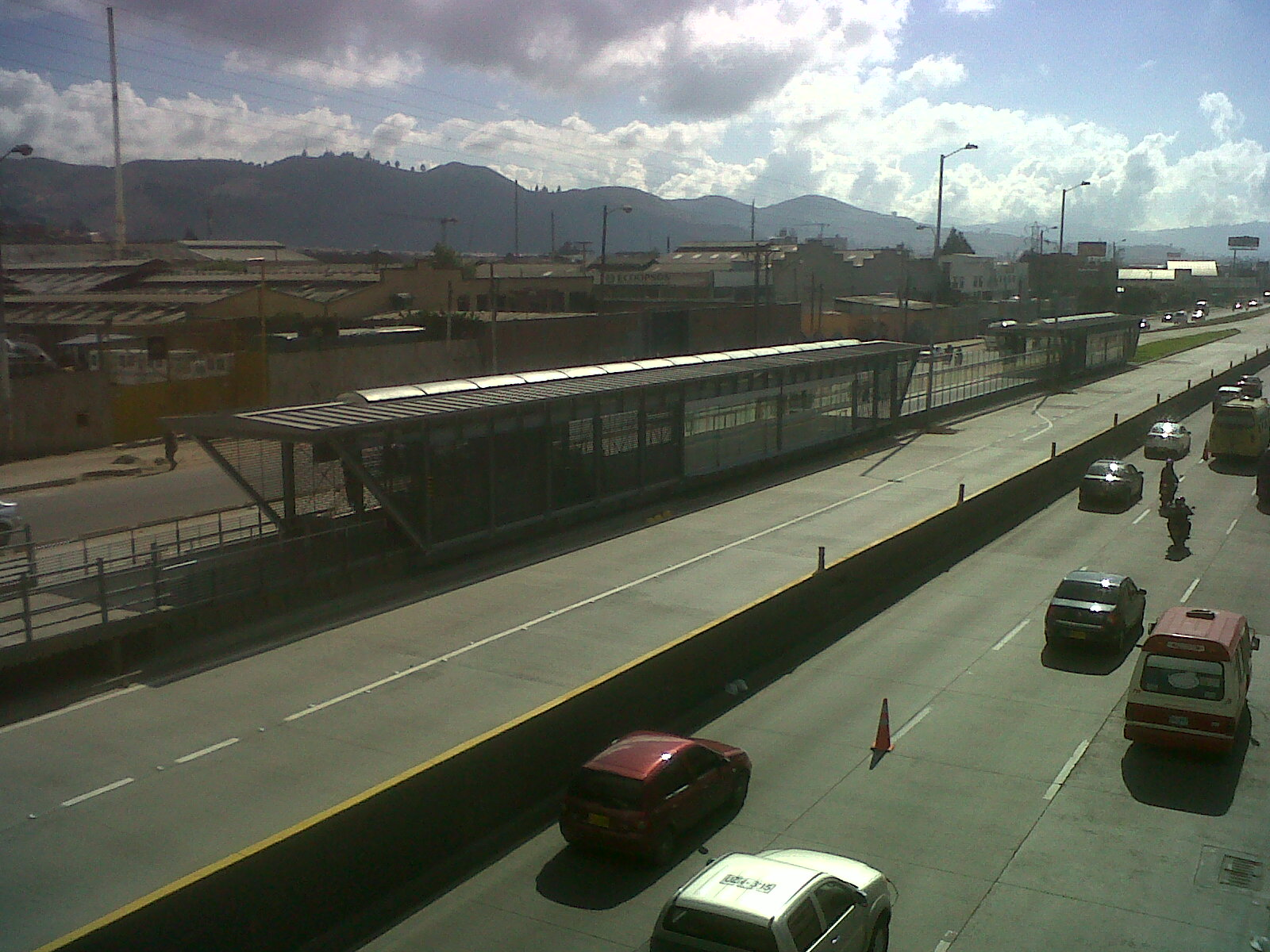

General information
- Location: Soacha; Colombia

History
- Opened: December 27, 2013

Services
Preceding station	TransMilenio	Following station
Estacion Bosa towards Comuneros	G	Leon XIII towards San Mateo

The single station La Despensa is part of the massive transport system Bogotá, TransMilenio, opened in the year 2000.

== Location ==
The station is located in the northeast sector of Soacha, specifically on the Autopista Sur between 55 and 56 streets.

== History ==
The opening of the season was delayed due to delays in the construction of Phase I in Soacha.

The station is named in reference to the neighborhood La Despensa, which is the border between the municipality of Soacha and Bogotá. Also meets the demand of the Industrial Zone Cazucá, and neighborhoods Station, Bosa and its surroundings.

== Service Station ==
=== Core Services ===
Services rendered from December 27, 2013
Type	Routes to the North	Routes to the West	Routes to the South
Express Every Day; All day	E42	K43	G42G43
Express Monday to Saturday morning and afternoon rush hour	B46		G46
Express Monday to Friday morning and afternoon rush hour	G45		G45
Express Saturday morning rush hour	G45		G45

|}
