= Alquería (TransMilenio) =

General information
- Location: Autopista Sur with Carrera 49A; Tunjuelito and Puente Aranda, Bogotá; Colombia

History
- Opened: April 15, 2006

Services
Preceding station	TransMilenio	Following station
General Santander towards Comuneros	G	Venecia towards San Mateo
Location

Alquería is a simple station, part of the TransMilenio mass-transit system of Bogotá, Colombia.

== Location ==
The station is located in southern Bogotá, specifically on Autopista Sur with Carrera 49A.

== History ==
This station was opened April 15, 2006 as part of the section between the stations General Santander and Portal del Sur of the NQS line.

== Station services ==
=== Old trunk services ===
Services rendered until April 29, 2006
Kind	Routes	Frequency
Current		Every 3 minutes on average

=== Main line service ===
Service as of April 29, 2006
Type	Routes to the North	Routes to the East	Routes to the South
Local	4		4
Express Monday to Saturday; All day	B11	L41	G11 G41
Express Monday to Friday; Morning rush hour		A52	
Express Monday to Friday; Afternoon rush hour			G52

=== Feeder routes ===
This station does not have connections to feeder routes.

=== Inter-city service ===
This station does not have inter-city service.

== See also ==
- List of TransMilenio stations
