= Leon XIII (TransMilenio) =

Bus stop in Bogotá, Colombia

León XIII
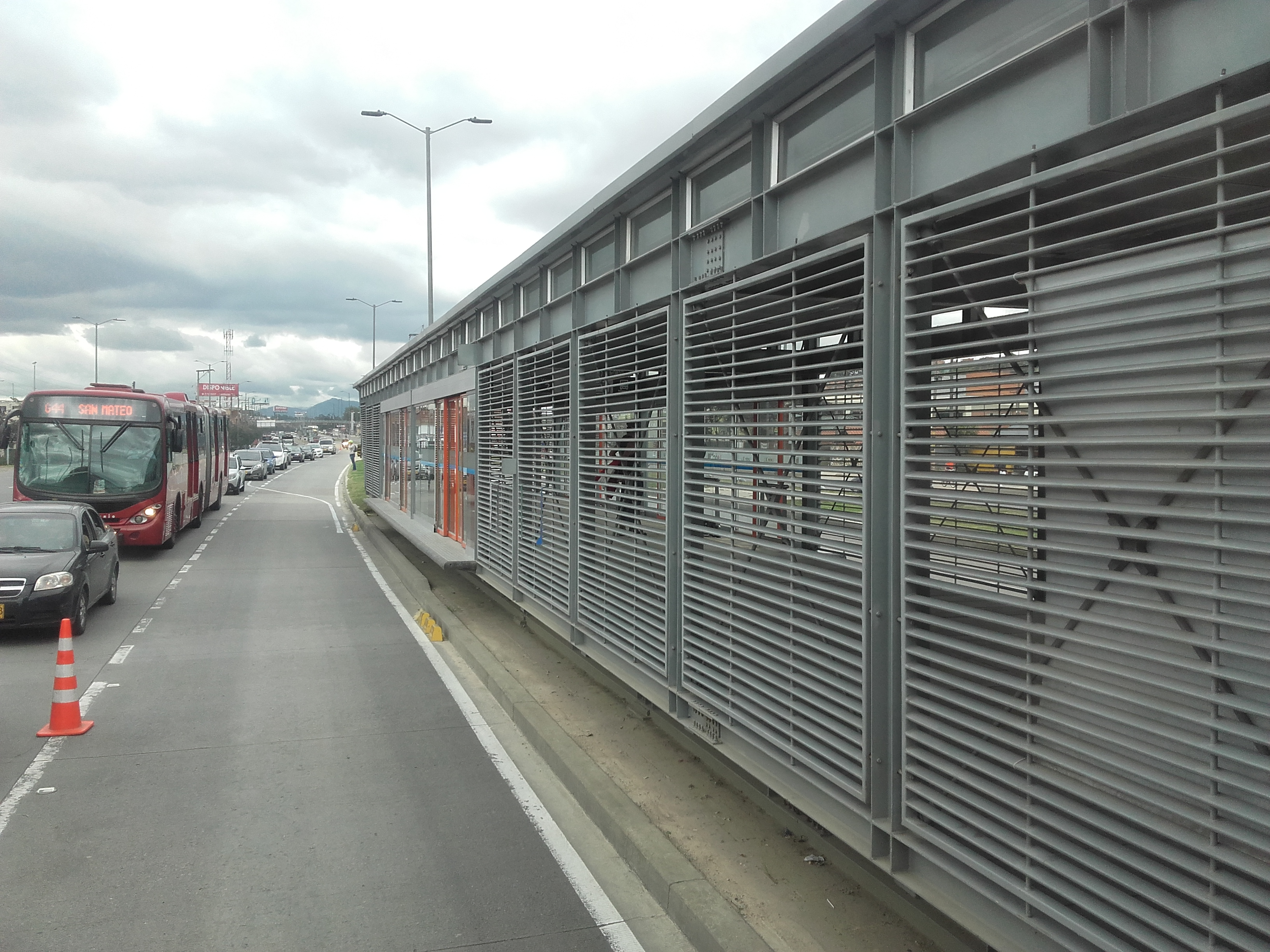

General information
- Location: Soacha; Colombia

History
- Opened: December 27, 2013

Services
Preceding station	TransMilenio	Following station
La Despensa towards Comuneros	G	Terreros towards San Mateo

The single station Leon XIII is part of the massive transport system Bogotá, TransMilenio, opened in the year 2000.

== Location ==
The station is located in the northeastern sector of Soacha, specifically on the Autopista Sur between 45 and 46 streets. It also serves the demand of the neighborhoods La María, Quintanares, Cazucá, Julio Rincón and its surroundings.

== History ==
The inauguration of the station was delayed due to the delays of the construction of the I Phase in Soacha.

== Etymology ==
The station receives the name in direct allusion to the neighborhood, Leon XIII, close to the station.

== Service Station ==
=== Main Services ===
Services rendered from December 27, 2013
Type	Routes to the North	Routes to the West	Routes to the South
Express Every Day; All day	E42	K43	G42G43
Express Monday to Saturday morning and afternoon rush hour	B46		G46
Express Monday to Friday morning and afternoon rush hour	G45		G45
Express Saturday morning rush hour	G45		G45
