= Terreros (TransMilenio) =

Bus station in Soacha, Bogotá, Colombia

Terreros - Hospital C.V.

General information
- Location: Soacha; Colombia

History
- Opened: December 27, 2013

Services
Preceding station	TransMilenio	Following station
Leon XIII towards Comuneros	G	San Mateo Terminus
Location

The single station Terreros - Hospital C.V. is part of the massive transport system Bogotá, TransMilenio, opened in the year 2000.

== Location ==
The station is located in the northeast-central sector of Soacha, specifically on the Autopista Sur with Calle 35. In its vicinity are the general police command of Soacha and the cardiovascular hospital of which also takes its first name. It also serves the demand of San Mateo, Rincón de Santa Fe, El Trébol and its environs.

== History ==
The inauguration of the station was delayed due to delays in the construction of phase I in Soacha. The August 4 A new car was put into operation on the south side of the pedestrian bridge that gives access to the station to expand the capacity of the station.

== Etymology ==
The first name of the station is in direct allusion to a hacienda declared historical heritage of Soacha and by the Avenida Terreros that passes close to the station. Your middle name Takes it from the child's cardiovascular hospital located 700 meters from the station, the station is located in the wide sector of San Mateo, making the Avenue one of the main entrances to the San Mateo neighborhood.

== Service Station ==
=== Main Services ===
Services rendered from December 27, 2013
Type	Routes to the North	Routes to the East	Routes to the West	Routes to the South
Express Every Day; All day	E42		K43	G42G43
Express Monday to Saturday; All day		L41		G41
Express Monday to Saturday morning and afternoon rush hour	B46			G46
Express Monday to Friday morning and afternoon rush hour	G45			G45
Express Saturday morning rush hour	G45			G45

== Cable ==
The station will have an aerial cable system similar to the Metrocable of the city of Medellín, this Metrocable will have four stations and will cover about 25 districts of the municipality of Soacha.
