= NQS Calle 30 Sur (TransMilenio) =

General information
- Location: Antonio Nariño (Bogotá); Colombia

History
- Opened: 2005

Services
Preceding station	TransMilenio	Following station
SENA towards Comuneros	G	NQS Calle 38 A Sur towards San Mateo
Location

The simple station NQS Calle 30 Sur is part of the TransMilenio mass-transit system of Bogotá, Colombia, opened in the year 2000.

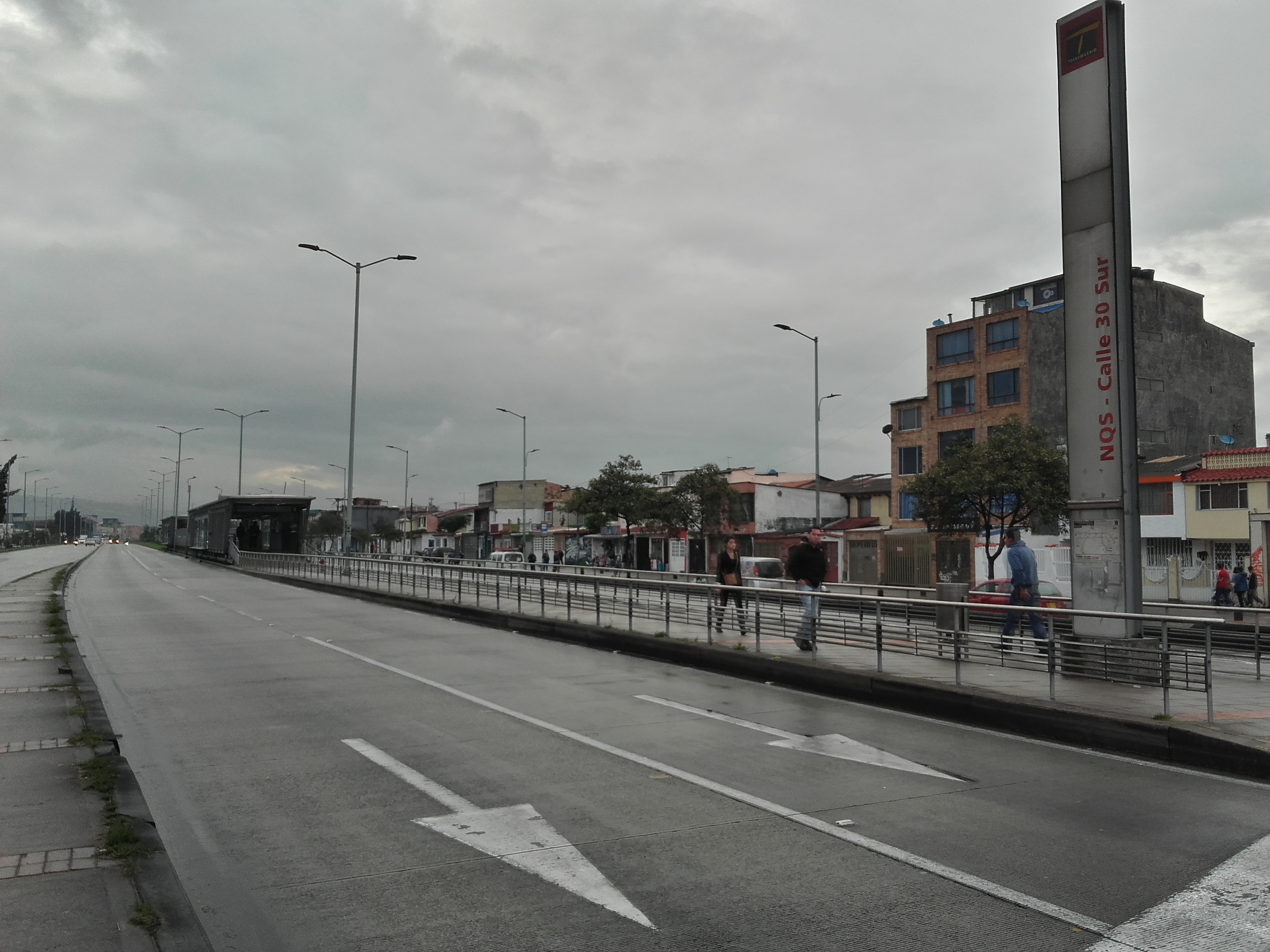
NQS Calle 30 Sur (TransMilenio)

== Location ==
The station is located in southern Bogotá, specifically on Avenida NQS with Calle 30 Sur.

It serves the Canal Albina area.

== History ==
In 2005, the NQS line of phase two of TransMilenio construction was opened, including this station.

== Station services ==
=== Old trunk services ===
Services rendered until April 29, 2006
Kind	Routes	Frequency
Current		Every 3 minutes on average

=== Main line service ===
Service as of April 29, 2006
Type	Routes to the North	Routes to the East	Routes to the South
Local	4		4
Express Monday to Saturday; All day	B11	L41	G11 G41
Express Monday to Friday; Morning rush hour		A52	
Express Monday to Friday; Afternoon rush hour			G52

=== Feeder routes ===
This station does not have connections to feeder routes.

=== Inter-city service ===
This station does not have inter-city service.

== See also ==
- Bogotá
- TransMilenio
- List of TransMilenio stations
