= Estacion Bosa (TransMilenio) =

Bus stop in Bogotá, Colombia

Estación Bosa

General information
- Location: Autopista Sur with calle 63 sur and 65 C sur Bosa neighborhood Colombia

History
- Opened: January 30, 2016

Services
| Preceding station | TransMilenio | Following station |
|---|---|---|
| Portal del Sur towards Comuneros | G | La Despensa towards San Mateo |
Location

The single station Estacion Bosa is part of the massive transport system Bogotá, TransMilenio, opened in the year 2000.

== Location ==
The station is located in Autopista Sur between the streets 63 south and 65 C south in Bosa to the south of the city. It attends the demand of the districts Bosa the Azucena and the Station, as well as the Perdomo and Casabianca of Ciudad Bolívar.

In the vicinity are the Terminal of Transport of the South and the Industrial Zone of Cazucá.

== Etymology ==
The station receives its name from the neighborhood Bosa The Station in which it will be located, right on the border with the municipality of Soacha.

== History ==
The station was designed to be built in the year 2013 to meet the demand of the locality of Bosa with an approximation of 8,000 passengers per day. The works are in charge of the Bosa Station Consortium 2013 and the interventory of the Consortium Interventores IDU The IDU starts construction of a new TransMilenio station in Bosa, The November 19, 2015 the Instituto de Desarrollo Urbano Urban Development Institute announced the completion of the construction of the station.

== Service Station ==
=== Main Services ===
Services rendered from January 30, 2016
| Type | Routes to the North | Routes to the East | Routes to the South |
|---|---|---|---|
| Express Every Day; All day | E42 | | G42 |
| Express Monday to Saturday; All day | | L41 | G41 |
| Express Monday to Saturday morning and afternoon rush hour | B46 | | G46 |
| Express Monday to Friday morning and afternoon rush hour | G45 | | G45 |
| Express Saturday morning rush hour | G45 | | G45 |
