= NQS Calle 38 A Sur (TransMilenio) =

General information
- Location: Antonio Nariño (Bogotá); Colombia

History
- Opened: 2005

Services
Preceding station	TransMilenio	Following station
NQS Calle 30 Sur towards Comuneros	G	General Santander towards San Mateo
Location

The simple station NQS Calle 38 A Sur is part of the TransMilenio mass-transit system of Bogotá, Colombia, opened in the year 2000.

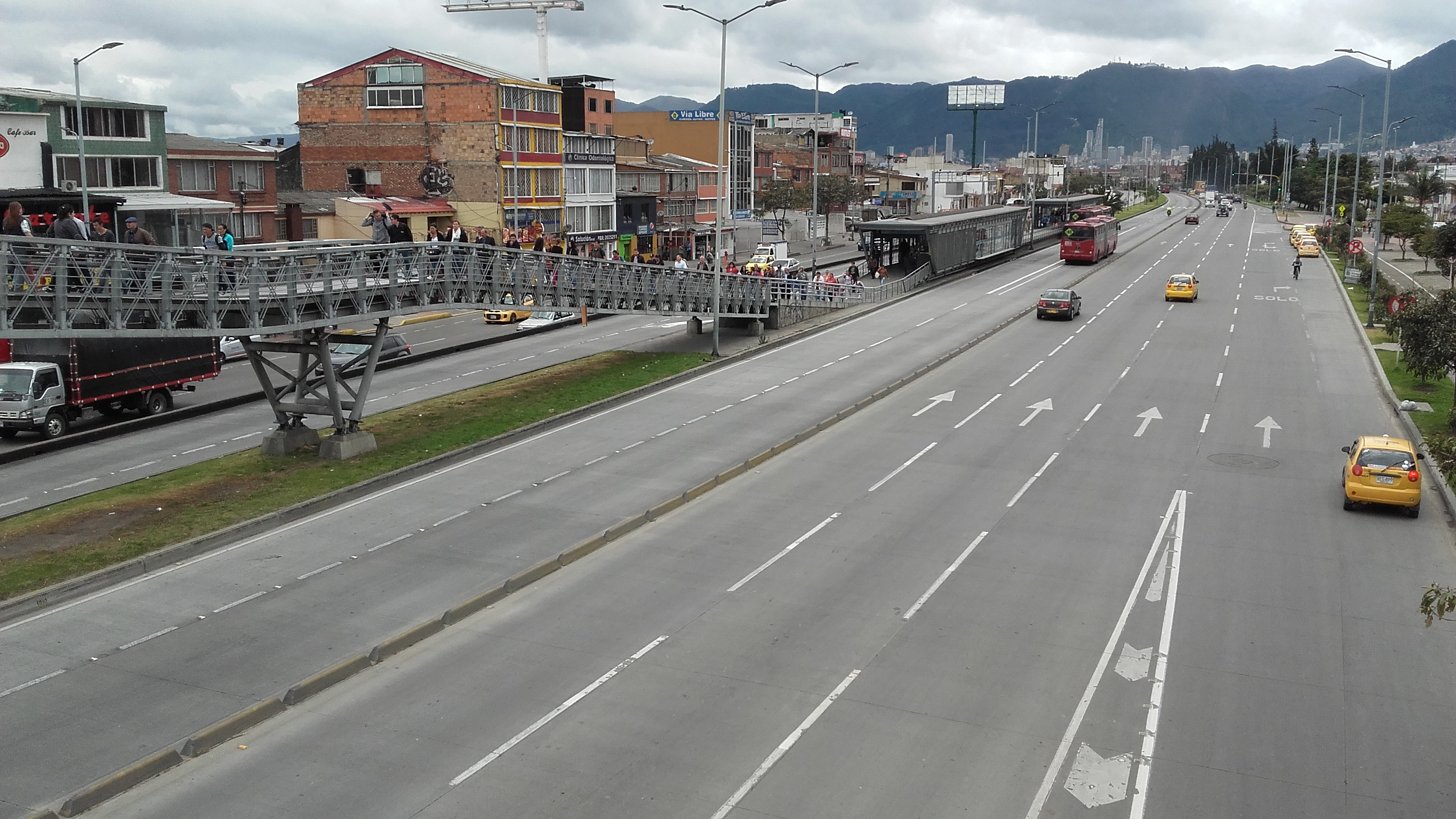
NQS Calle 38 A Sur (TransMilenio

== Location ==
The station is located in southern Bogotá, specifically on Avenida NQS with Calle 39 Sur.

It serves the Villa Mayor neighborhood and surrounding areas.

== History ==
In 2005, the NQS line of phase two of TransMilenio construction was opened, including this station.

== Station services ==
=== Old trunk services ===
Services rendered until April 29, 2006
Kind	Routes	Frequency
Current		Every 3 minutes on average

=== Main line service ===
Service as of April 29, 2006
Type	Routes to the North	Routes to the East	Routes to the South
Local	4		4
Express Every Day; All day		M47	G47
Express Monday to Saturday; All day	B11		G11
Express Monday to Friday; All day	C30		C30
Express Saturday from 5:00 a.m. to 3:00 p.m.	C30		C30

=== Feeder routes ===
This station does not have connections to feeder routes.

=== Inter-city service ===
This station does not have inter-city service.

== See also ==
- Bogotá
- TransMilenio
- List of TransMilenio stations
