= SENA (TransMilenio) =

General information
- Location: Antonio Nariño (Bogotá); Colombia

History
- Opened: 2005

Services
Preceding station	TransMilenio	Following station
Santa Isabel towards Comuneros	G	NQS Calle 30 Sur towards San Mateo
Location

The simple station SENA is part of the TransMilenio mass-transit system of Bogotá, Colombia, opened in the year 2000.

== Location ==
The station is located in southern Bogotá, specifically on Avenida NQS with Calle 16 Sur.

It serves the Ciudad Montes area and surrounding neighborhoods.

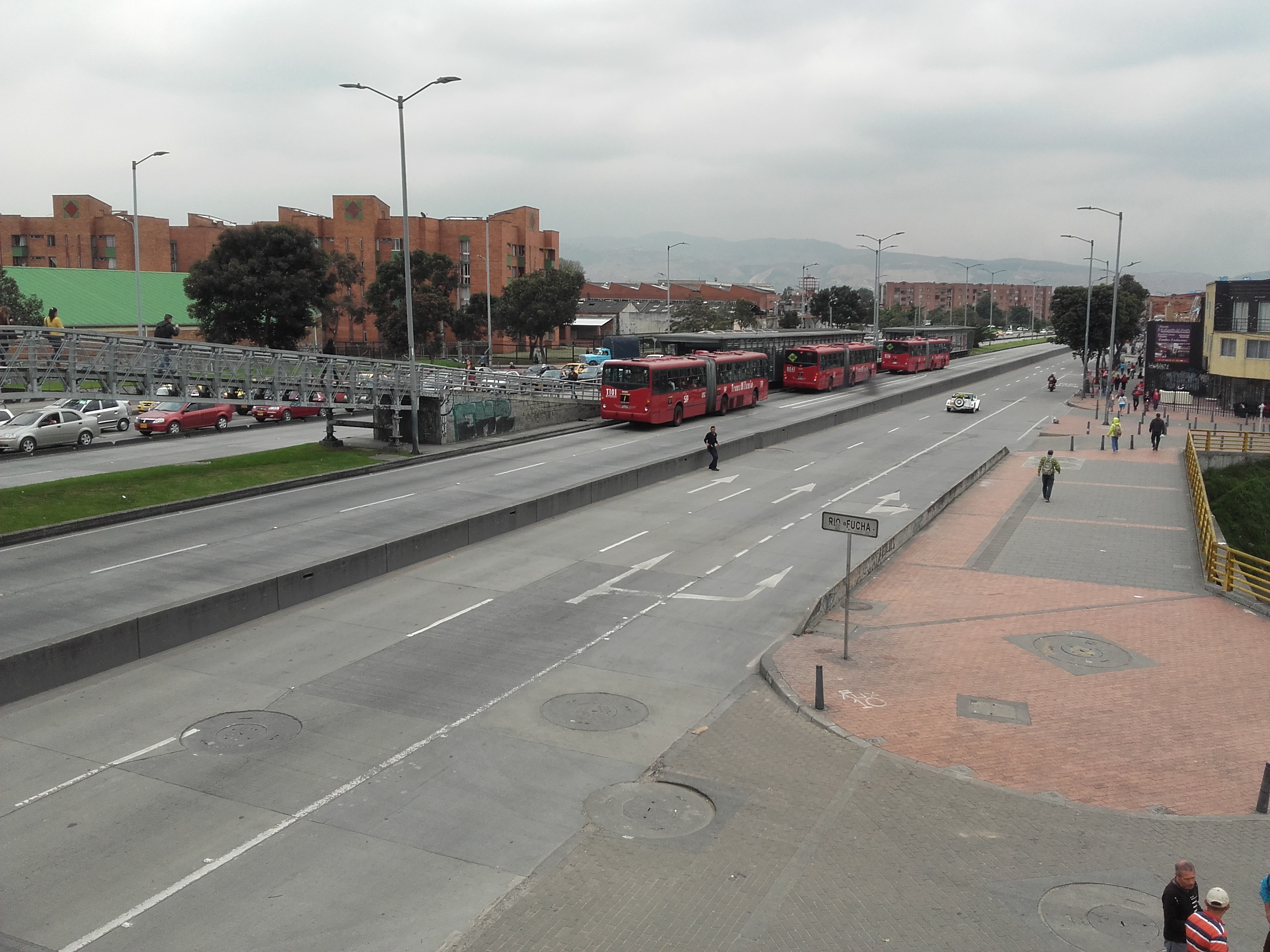
SENA (TransMilenio)

== History ==
In 2005, the NQS line of phase two of TransMilenio construction was opened, including this station.

It receives its name due to its proximity to the main campus of SENA (National Learning Service).

== Station services ==
=== Old trunk services ===
Services rendered until April 29, 2006
Kind	Routes	Frequency
Current		Every 3 minutes on average
Express	Expreso 160	Every 2 minutes on average

=== Main line service ===
Service as of April 29, 2006
Type	Routes to the North	Routes to the West	Routes to the South
Local	4		4
Express Every Day; All day	D22	K43	G22 G43
Express Monday to Saturday; All day	B11		G11

=== Feeder routes ===
This station does not have connections to feeder routes.

=== Inter-city service ===
This station does not have inter-city service.

== See also ==
- Bogotá
- TransMilenio
- List of TransMilenio stations
