= Santa Isabel (TransMilenio) =

General information
- Location: Los Mártires and Puente Aranda; Colombia

History
- Opened: 2005

Services
Preceding station	TransMilenio	Following station
Comuneros Terminus	G	SENA towards San Mateo
Location

The simple-station Santa Isabel, is part of the TransMilenio mass-transit system of Bogotá, Colombia, opened in the year 2000.

== Location ==
This station is located in south-central Bogotá, more specifically on Troncal NQS with Calle 2.

It serves Santa Isabel and surrounding neighborhoods.

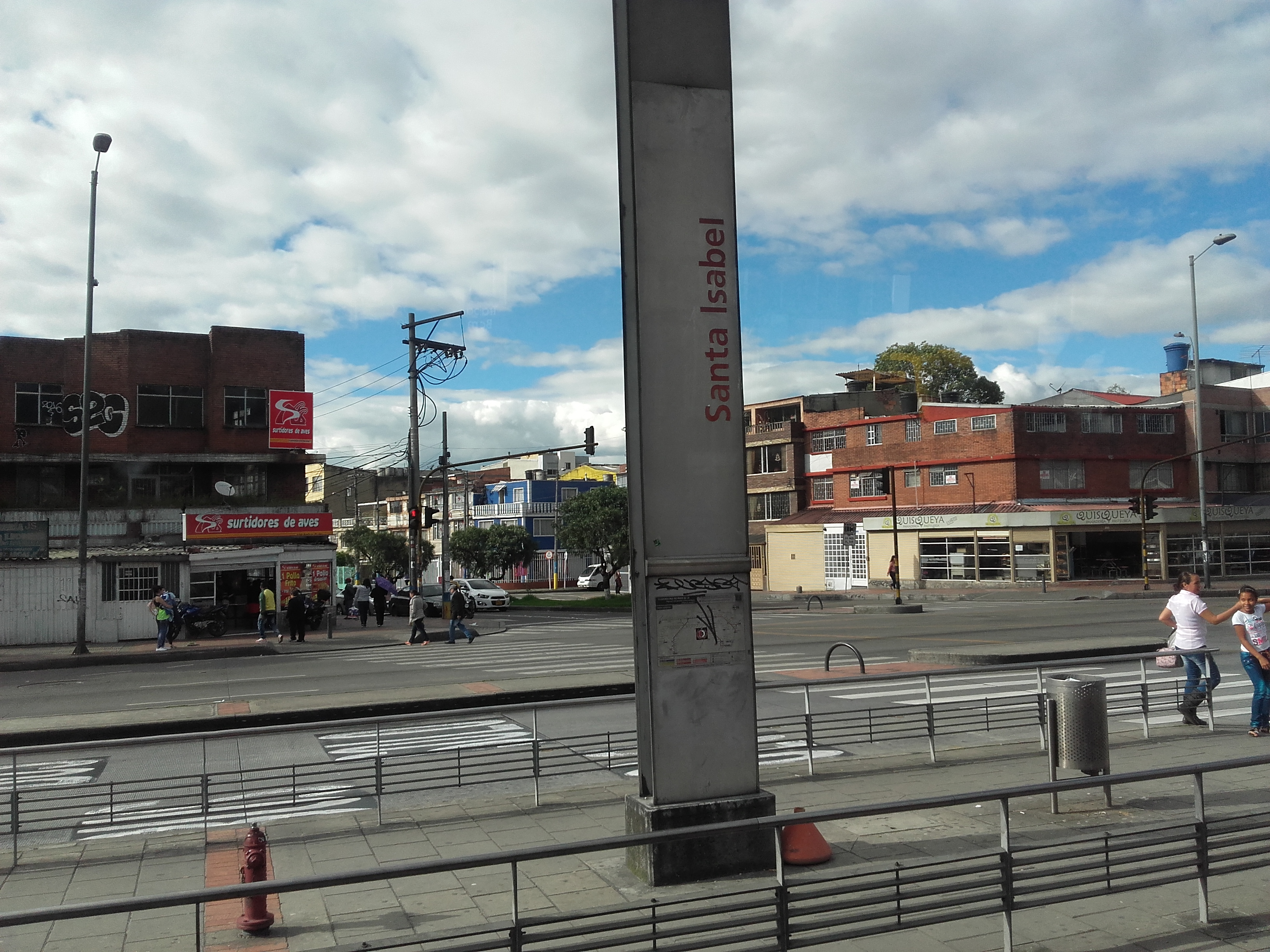
Santa Isabel (TransMilenio)

== History ==
In 2005, the NQS line of the system opened as the second line of phase two of construction. This station was opened during that expansion.

== Station services ==
=== Old trunk services ===
Services rendered until April 29, 2006
Kind	Routes	Frequency
Current		Every 3 minutes on average
Express	Expreso 130 Expreso 150	Every 2 minutes on average

=== Main line service ===
Service as of April 29, 2006
Type	Routes to the North	Routes to the East	Routes to the South
Local	4		4
Express Monday to Saturday; All day	B11		G11
Express Monday to Friday; All day	C30		C30
Express Monday to Friday; Morning rush hour		A52	
Express Monday to Friday; Afternoon rush hour			G52
Express Saturday from 5:00 a.m. to 3:00 p.m.	C30		C30
Routes that start at the station
Local	7		
Routes that finish in the station
Local			7

=== Feeder Routes ===
This station does not have connections to feeder routes.

=== Inter-city service ===
This station does not have inter-city service.

== See also ==
- Bogotá
- TransMilenio
