= General Santander (TransMilenio) =

General information
- Location: Antonio Nariño (Bogotá); Colombia

History
- Opened: 2005

Services
Preceding station	TransMilenio	Following station
NQS Calle 38 A Sur towards Comuneros	G	Alquería towards San Mateo
Location

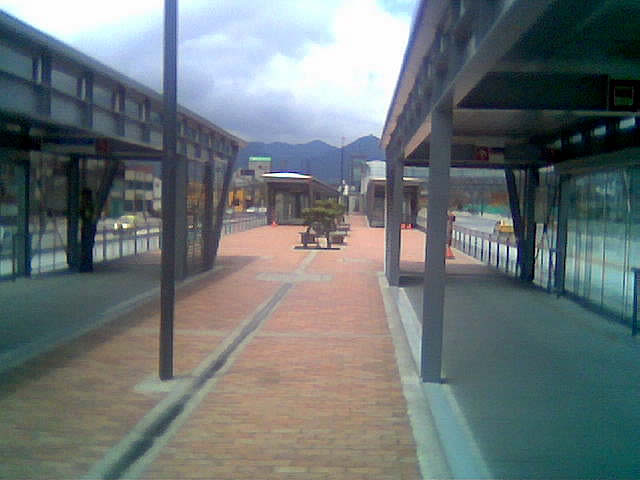
General Santander

The intermediate station General Santander is part of the TransMilenio mass-transit system of Bogotá, Colombia, opened in the year 2000.

== Location ==
The station is located in southern Bogotá, specifically on Avenida NQS south of the Avenida Batallón Caldas bridge.

== History ==
In October 2005, phase two of the TransMilenio opened from Calle 92 with Autopista Norte to General Santander.

The station receives its name due to the proximity of the police school located a few blocks away.

The station is the only one in the system located in three localities of Bogotá. The supports for the pedestrian bridge on the north side are located in Puente Aranda, while the supports for the southern bridge are located in Rafael Uribe Uribe. The transfer point for the feeder routes is located in Antonio Nariño.

== Station Services ==
In 2006, began functioning as an intermediate station, serving both main-line buses and feeder routes.

=== Old trunk services ===
Services rendered until April 29, 2006
Kind	Routes	Frequency
Current		Every 3 minutes on average
Express	Expreso 130 Expreso 150	Every 2 minutes on average

=== Main line service ===
Service as of July 23, 2012
Type	Routes to the North	Routes to the East	Routes to the South	Routes to the West
Local	4		4	
Express Every Day; All day	B12 D22		G12 G22 G43	K43
Express Monday to Friday; All day	C30		C30	
Express Monday to Friday; Morning rush hour		A52		
Express Monday to Friday; Afternoon rush hour			G52	
Express Saturday from 5:00 a.m. to 3:00 p.m.	C30		C30	

=== Feeder routes ===
The station has connections to the following feeder route:

- 12.1Fátima loop

=== Inter-city service ===
This station does not have inter-city service.

== See also ==
- Bogotá
- TransMilenio
- List of TransMilenio stations
