= Portal del Sur (TransMilenio) =

Terminus station in Bogota, Colombia

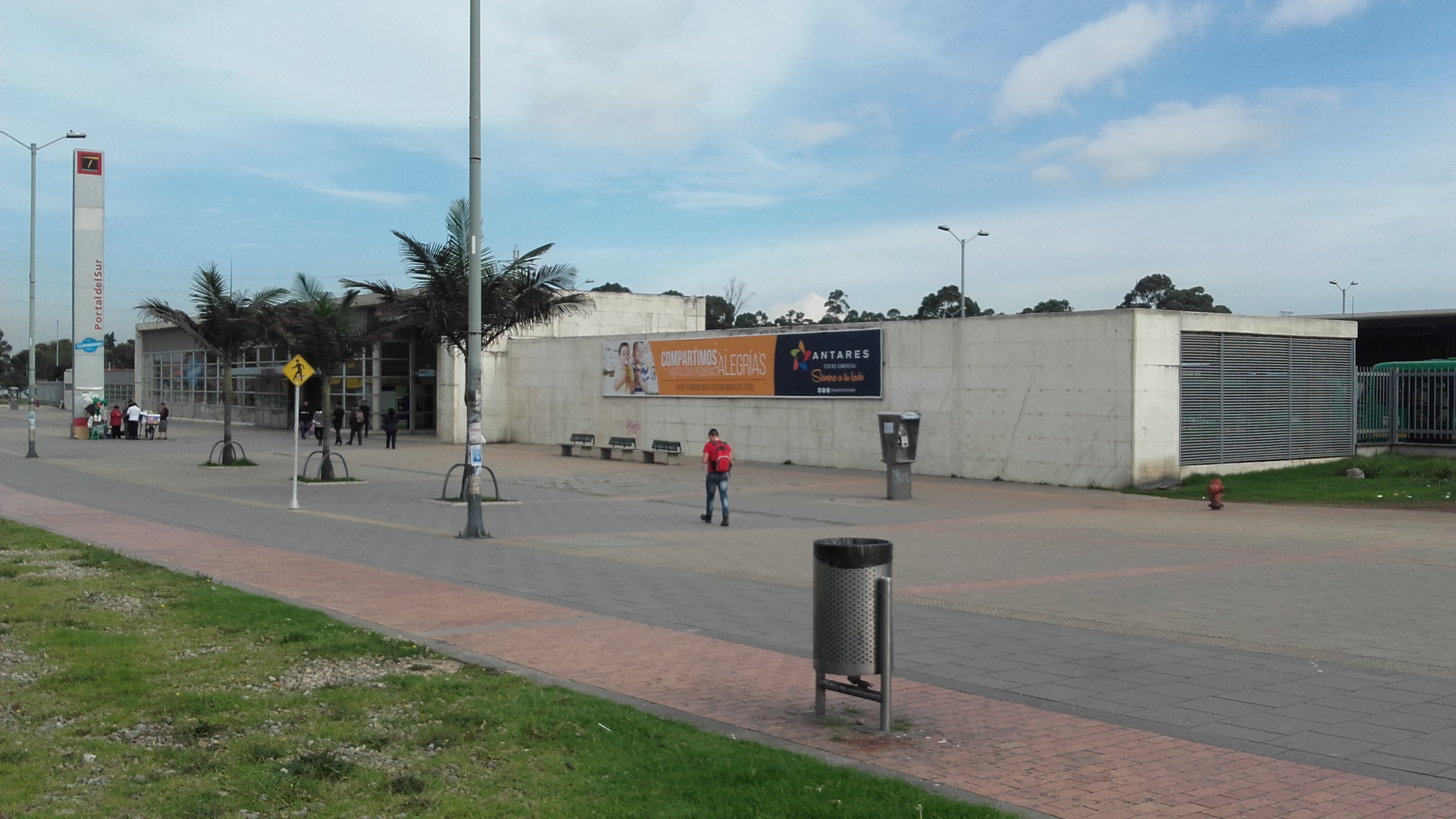

General information
- Location: Bosa (Bogotá); Colombia

History
- Opened: April 15, 2006

Services
| Preceding station | TransMilenio | Following station |
|---|---|---|
| Perdomo towards Comuneros | G | Estacion Bosa towards San Mateo |
Location

Portal del Sur is one of the terminus stations of the TransMilenio mass-transit system of Bogotá, Colombia, which opened in the year 2000.

== Location ==
The Portal del Sur is located in the south of the city, more specifically on Autopista Sur where it meets the cemetery Jardines del Apogeo (carrera 72D).

== History ==
The inauguration of the head station was made on April 15, 2006, although public space works and some mixed lanes continued until June of the same year.

The portal has a cycling service for users.

Beginning in September 2013, "TuLlave" travel cards work in the Portal del Sur, after months of discussions on how to start integrating the cards used in all phases of TransMilenio.

== Station services ==
=== Old trunk services ===
Services rendered until April 29, 2006
| Kind | Routes | Frequency |
|---|---|---|
| Current | | Every 3 minutes on average |
| Express | Expreso 150 Expreso 160 | Every 2 minutes on average |

=== Main line service ===
Service as of April 29, 2006
| Type | Routes to the North | Routes to the East | Routes to the South |
|---|---|---|---|
| Local | 4 | | |
| Express Every Day; All day | B12 D22 | M47 | |
| Express Monday to Saturday; All day | B11 | | |
| Express Monday to Friday; All day | C30 | | |
| Express Monday to Friday; Morning and afternoon rush hour | | | G45 |
| Express Monday to Friday; Morning rush hour | | A52 | |
| Express Saturday morning rush hour | | | G45 |
| Express Saturday from 5:00 a.m. to 3:00 p.m. | C30 | | |
Routes that finish in the station
| Local | 4 | | |
| Express Every Day; All day | G12 G22 G47 | | |
| Express Monday to Saturday; All day | G11 | | |
| Express Monday to Friday; All day | G30 | | |
| Express Monday to Friday; Afternoon rush hour | G52 | | |
| Express Monday to Friday; Morning and afternoon rush hour | G45 | | |
| Express Saturday morning rush hour | G45 | | |
| Express Saturday from 5:00 a.m. to 3:00 p.m. | G30 | | |

=== Feeder Routes ===
The station receives the following feeder routes:

- 10.1 Avenida Bosa loop
- 10.2 Bosa Centro loop
- 10.3 Albán Carbonell loop
- 10.4 Bosa Laureles loop
- 10.5 Terminal Sur loop
- 10.6 Perdomo loop
- 10.8 Olarte - Timiza loop

=== Special Services ===
The following special route also works:

- 10.10 to the Cazucá neighborhood.

=== Circular Routes ===
Currently, the following SITP circular routes are entered at the Portal del Sur:

- T04 to the Tres Esquinas neighborhood.
- 91 Urban Porciuncula, from Bosa San José (from 4:30 a.m. to 8:30 p.m.).
- Circular Bogotá - San Mateo

=== Inter-city service ===
At the completion of construction, there are plans for inter-city service from the surrounding municipalities of Soacha and Sibaté. The station has capacity for 13 inter-city buses at the same time, plus additional space for feeder routes.

== See also ==
- Bogotá
- TransMilenio
- List of TransMilenio stations
