= Non-Quasi Static model =

Non-Quasi Static model (NQS) is a transistor model used in analogue/mixed signal IC design. It becomes necessary to use an NQS model when the operational frequency of the device is in the range of its transit time. Normally, in a quasi-static (QS) model, voltage changes in the MOS transistor channel are assumed to be instantaneous. However, in an NQS model voltage changes relating to charge carriers are delayed.
