= San Mateo (TransMilenio) =

Bus stop in Bogotá, Colombia

San Mateo – Centro Comercial Unisur
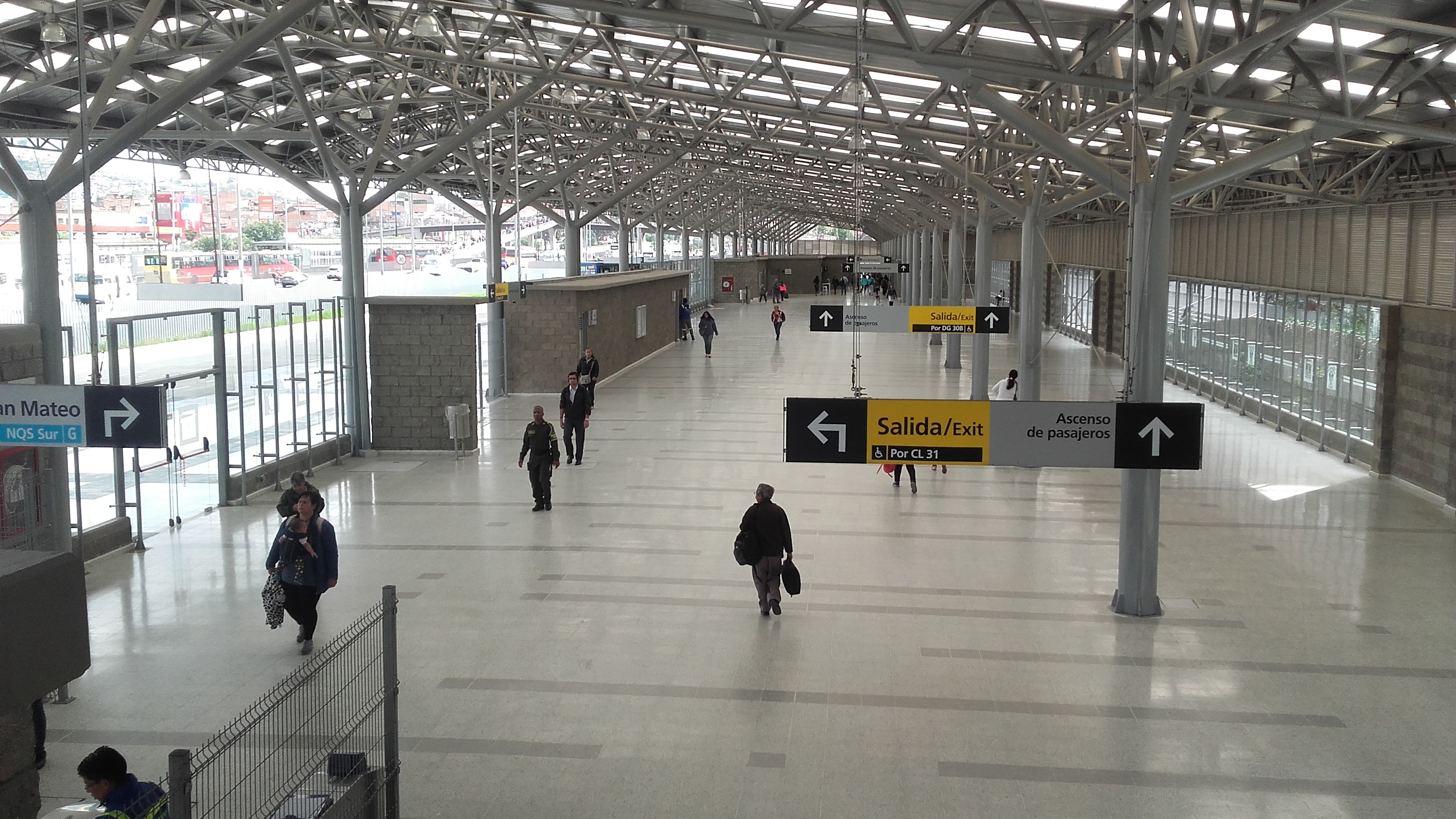

General information
- Location: Autopista Sur / Carrera 7 with Avenida; Soacha; Colombia

History
- Opened: December 27, 2013

Services
Preceding station	TransMilenio	Following station
Terreros towards Comuneros	G	Terminus
Location

The San Mateo – Centro Comercial Unisur intermediate station is part of the TransMilenio mass transit system of Bogotá, Colombia.

== Location ==
The station is located in the central sector of Soacha, specifically on the Autopista Sur with Calle 30. It servesthe neighborhoods of Ciudad Verde, El Nogal, El Porvenir, Ciudadela Sucre and its surroundings.

== History ==
The inauguration of the station was delayed by the construction of Phase 1 in Soacha. It will be integrated with a new shopping center. On May 28, 2016, the feeder terminal opened. That same day, the circular route San Mateo began to operate that connects this station directly with the Portal del Sur in Bogotá.

== Facilities ==
The feeder terminal is on the north side of the Autopista Sur, connected to the station by a pedestrian bridge widening the access to the station. A bicycle rack offers 650 available spaces.

== Etymology ==
The station name alludes to the nearby San Mateo neighborhood. Near it are Mercurio, Antares and Unisur shopping centers.

== Service Station ==
=== Main Services ===
Services rendered from December 27, 2013
Type	Routes to the North	Routes to the East	Routes to the West
Express Every Day; All day	E42		K43
Express Monday to Saturday; All day		L41	
Express Monday to Saturday morning and afternoon rush hour	B46		
Express Monday to Friday morning and afternoon rush hour	G45		
Express Saturday morning rush hour	G45		
Routes that finish in the station
Express Every Day; All day	G42 G43		
Express Monday to Saturday; All day	G41		
Express Monday to Saturday morning and afternoon rush hour	G46		
Express Monday to Friday morning and afternoon rush hour	G45		
Express Saturday morning rush hour	G45		

=== Urban service ===
Also works the following circular urban route between Bogotá and Soacha:

- Circular Bogotá – San Mateo – Centro Comercial Unisur
