= Comuneros (TransMilenio) =

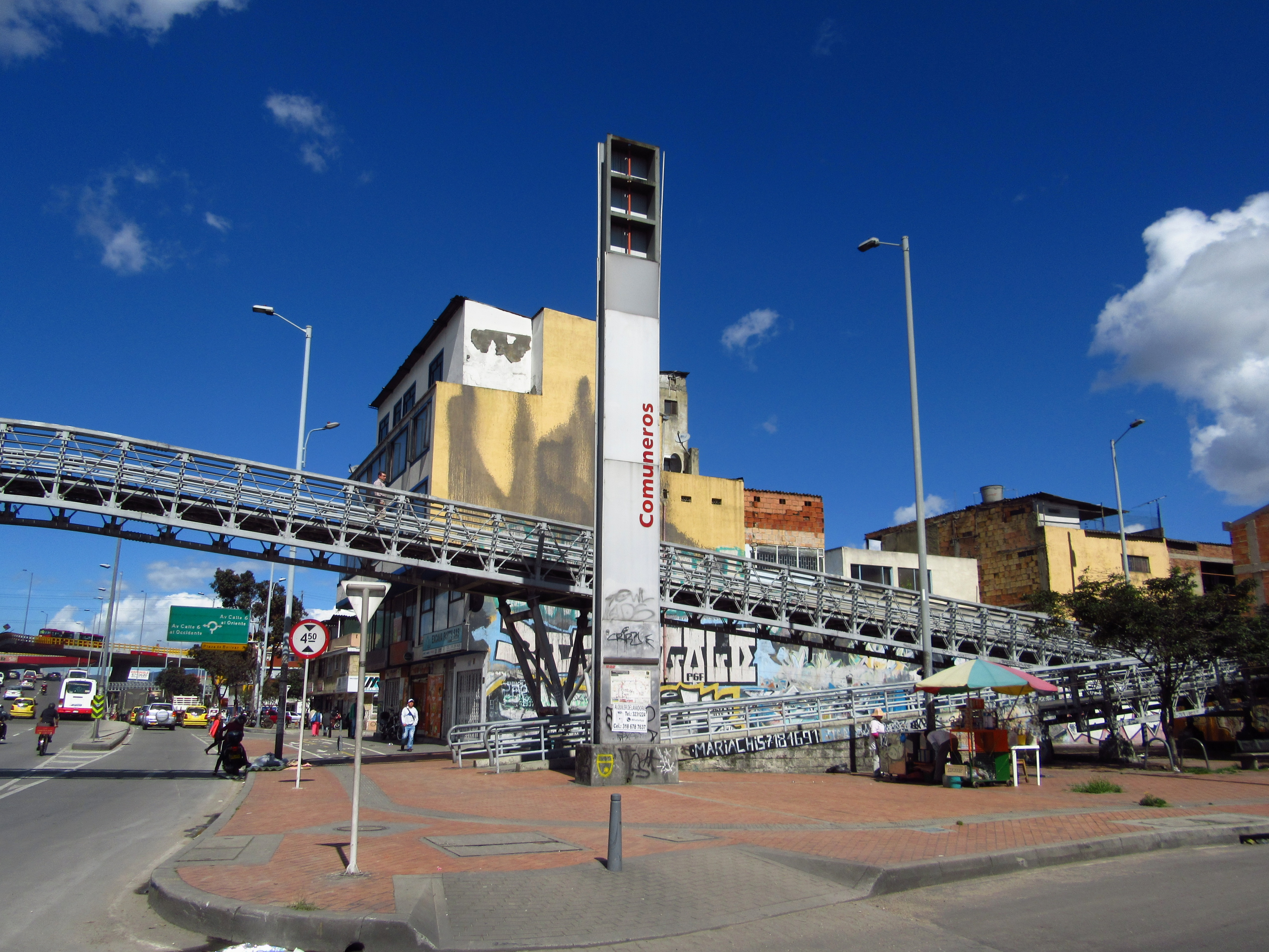

General information
- Location: Avenida NQS between Calles 3 and 5A; Los Mártires and Puente Aranda; Colombia

History
- Opened: 2005

Services
Preceding station	TransMilenio	Following station
Ricaurte towards La Castellana	E	Guatoque - Veraguas towards Tygua - San José
Terminus	G	Santa Isabel towards San Mateo
Location

Comuneros is a station on the TransMilenio mass-transit system of Bogotá, Colombia.

== Location ==
The station is located on Avenida NQS between Calles 3 and 5A, south of downtown Bogotá.

== History ==
The station opened in 2005 as part of the second line of phase two of TransMilenio construction, opening service to Avenida NQS. It is so named due to its proximity to the Avenida de los Comuneros (Calle 6ª).

== Station services ==
=== Old trunk services ===
Services until April 29, 2006
Kind	Routes	Frequency
Current		Every 3 minutes on average
Express	Expreso 150	Every 2 minutes on average

=== Main line service ===
Service as of April 29, 2006
Type	Routes to the North	Routes to the East	Routes to the South
Local	47		47
Express Every Day; All day	B12 E42	M47	G12 G42 G47

== See also ==
- List of TransMilenio Stations
