= Parque Municipal =

Parque Municipal is Portuguese and Spanish for "municipal park". It may refer to:

- Parque Municipal Américo Renné Giannetti, a public park in Belo Horizonte, Minas Gerais, Brazil
- Parque Municipal Summit, a botanical garden and wildlife rescue park in Panama City, Panama
- Parque Municipal Reina Sofía, a public park in La Línea de la Concepción, Cádiz, Spain
- Parque Municipal das Fontes (Lagoa), a park and spring site in Lagoa, Algarve, Portugal
- Parque Municipal do Relvão (Angra do Heroísmo), a public park in Angra do Heroísmo, Terceira Island, Azores, Portugal
- Parque Municipal Agustín Ross, a park in Pichilemu, Chile, also known as Parque Agustín Ross
- Parque Municipal dos Desportos de Fafe, the former name of a municipal sports stadium in Fafe, Portugal
- Taquara Municipal Nature Park, a municipal nature park in Duque de Caxias, Rio de Janeiro, Brazil, known in Portuguese as Parque Natural Municipal da Taquara
- Montanhas de Teresópolis Municipal Nature Park, a municipal nature park in Teresópolis, Rio de Janeiro, Brazil, known in Portuguese as Parque Natural Municipal Montanhas de Teresópolis
- Lagoa do Parado Municipal Nature Park, a municipal nature park in Guaratuba, Paraná, Brazil, also known as Parque Municipal Lagoa do Parado

== See also ==
- Parque, a disambiguation page for uses of the word Parque
- Municipal park, a public park owned or managed by a municipal government
