= TransMiCable =

Aerial tramway in Bogotá, Colombia

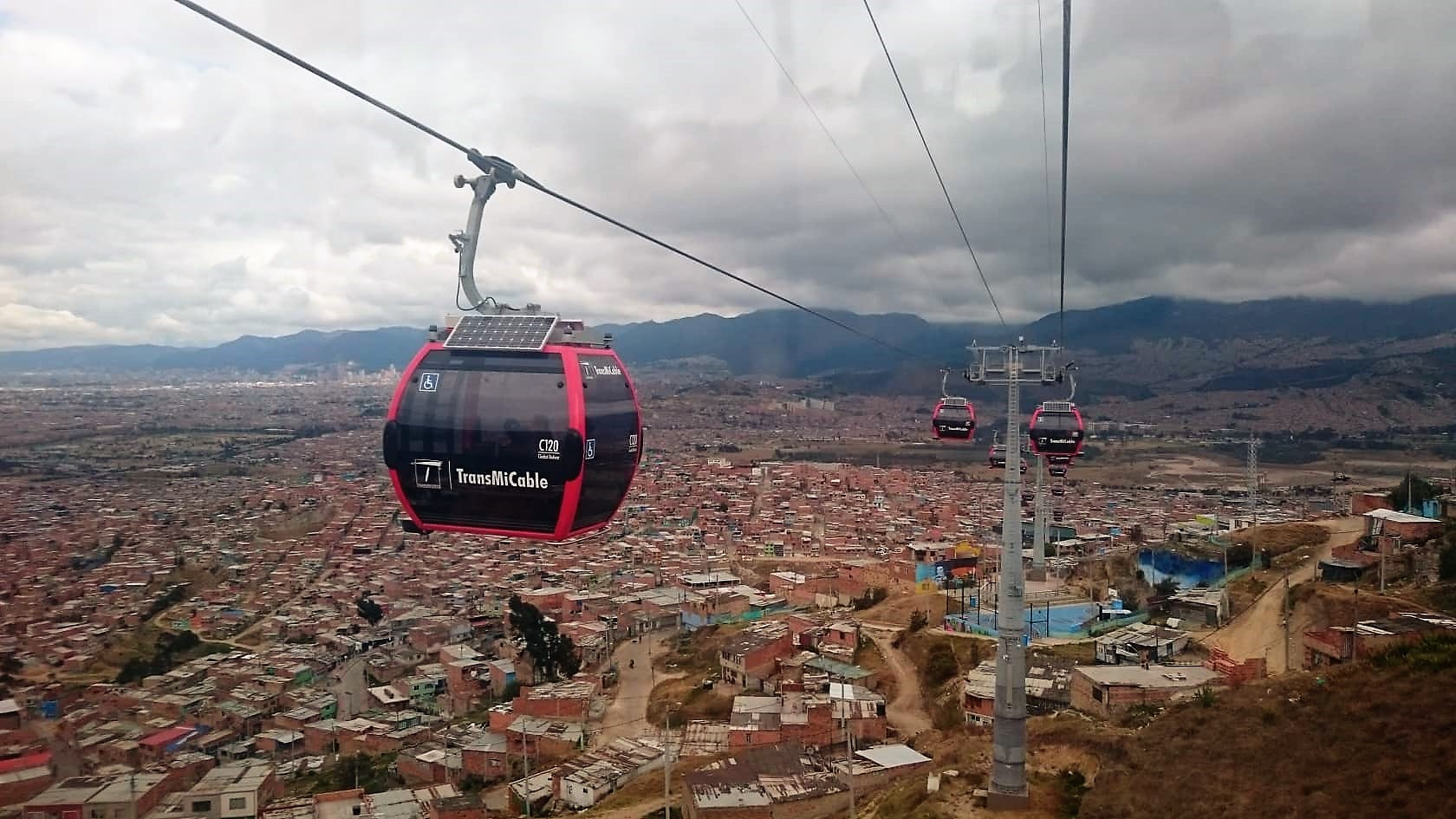

Overview
- Status: Operational
- Character: Urban
- Location: Bogotá, Colombia
- Termini: Portal del Tunal (TransMilenio); Mirador del Paraíso
- Open: December 27, 2018; 7 years ago (Line T)

Operation
- Ridership: 7.7 million (2025)

Technical features
- Line length: 3,340 m (10,960 ft) (Line T)
- Operating speed: 10 miles per hour (16 km/h)
- Notes: Electric motor powering cable bullwheel

TransMiCable is a gondola lift system implemented by the city of Bogotá, Colombia, with the purpose of providing a complementary transportation service to TransMilenio. Line T, with a length of 3.34 km and four stations, connects the Portal del Tunal (TransMilenio) station to Mirador del Paraíso station in the steep hills of Ciudad Bolívar district and was opened on 27 December 2018. It is part of the city's Integrated Public Transport System, along with TransMilenio and the urban, complementary and special bus services operating on neighbourhoods and main streets.

The system was built in 26 months and is designed to transport 7,000 people per hour.

== Lines ==
TransMiCable consists of one gondola lift line (Line T) with a length of 3.34 km located in Ciudad Bolívar district in the south of the city.

Line T
Station	Interchange	Location
Tunal	Portal del Tunal H	Villavicencio Avenue and Boyacá Avenue
Juan Pablo II	SITP	67C South street and 18R road
Manitas	SITP	70G South street and 18K road
Mirador del Paraíso	SITP	71H South street and 27 road

=== Future plans ===
The second line was awarded to the Doppelmayr consortium in March 2023. It will be a 2.8 km line constructed in the San Cristóbal locality.

San Cristobal line
Station	Interchange	Location
20 de Julio	Portal 20 de Julio L	30a South street and 4 road
Victory	SITP	41 South street and 3 East road
Altamira	SITP	43a South street and 12b East road

== See also ==
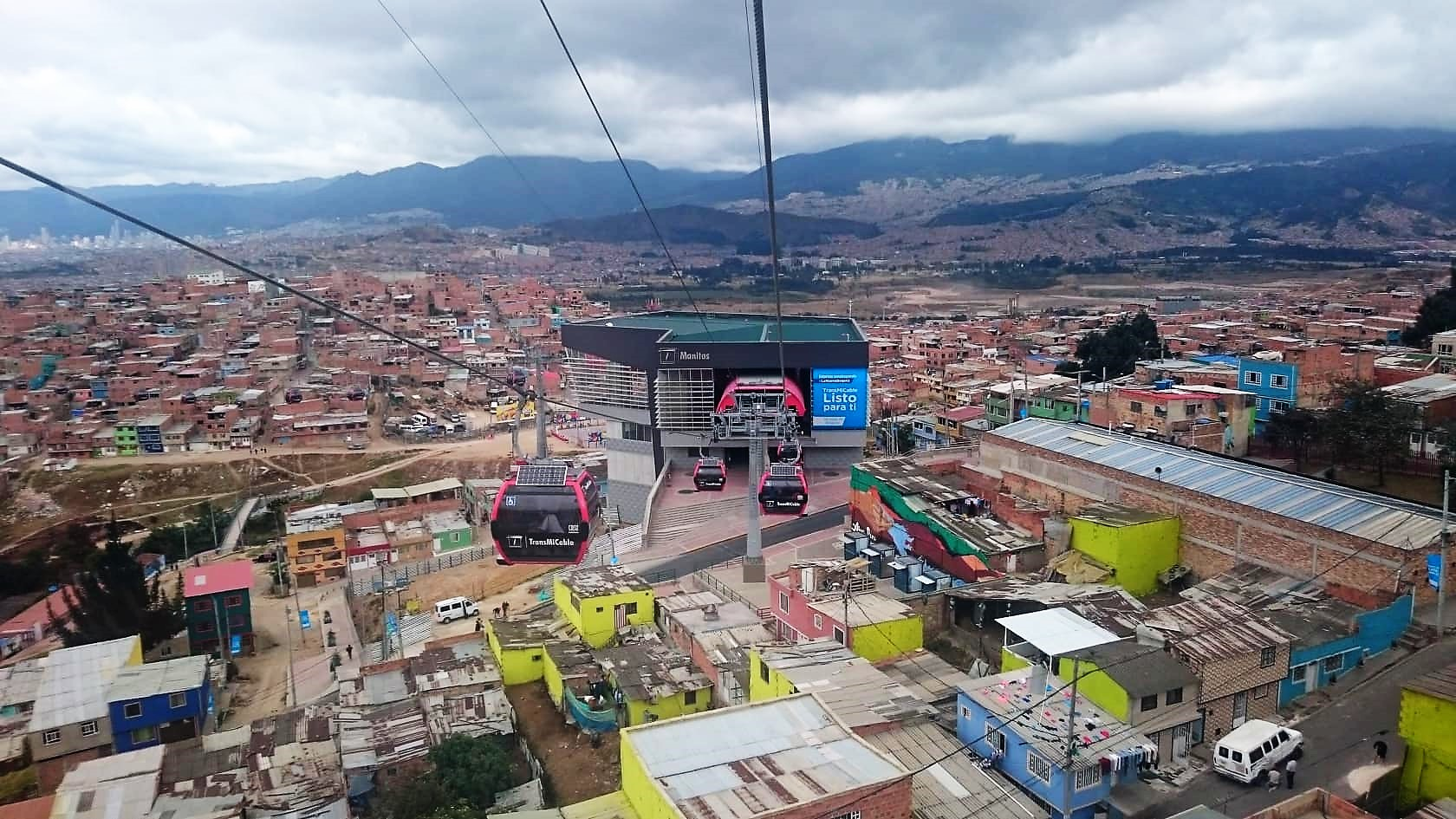
Manitas station

Media related to TransMiCable at Wikimedia Commons

- List of gondola lifts
