= Portal 20 de Julio (TransMilenio) =

TransMilenio terminal station in Bogotá

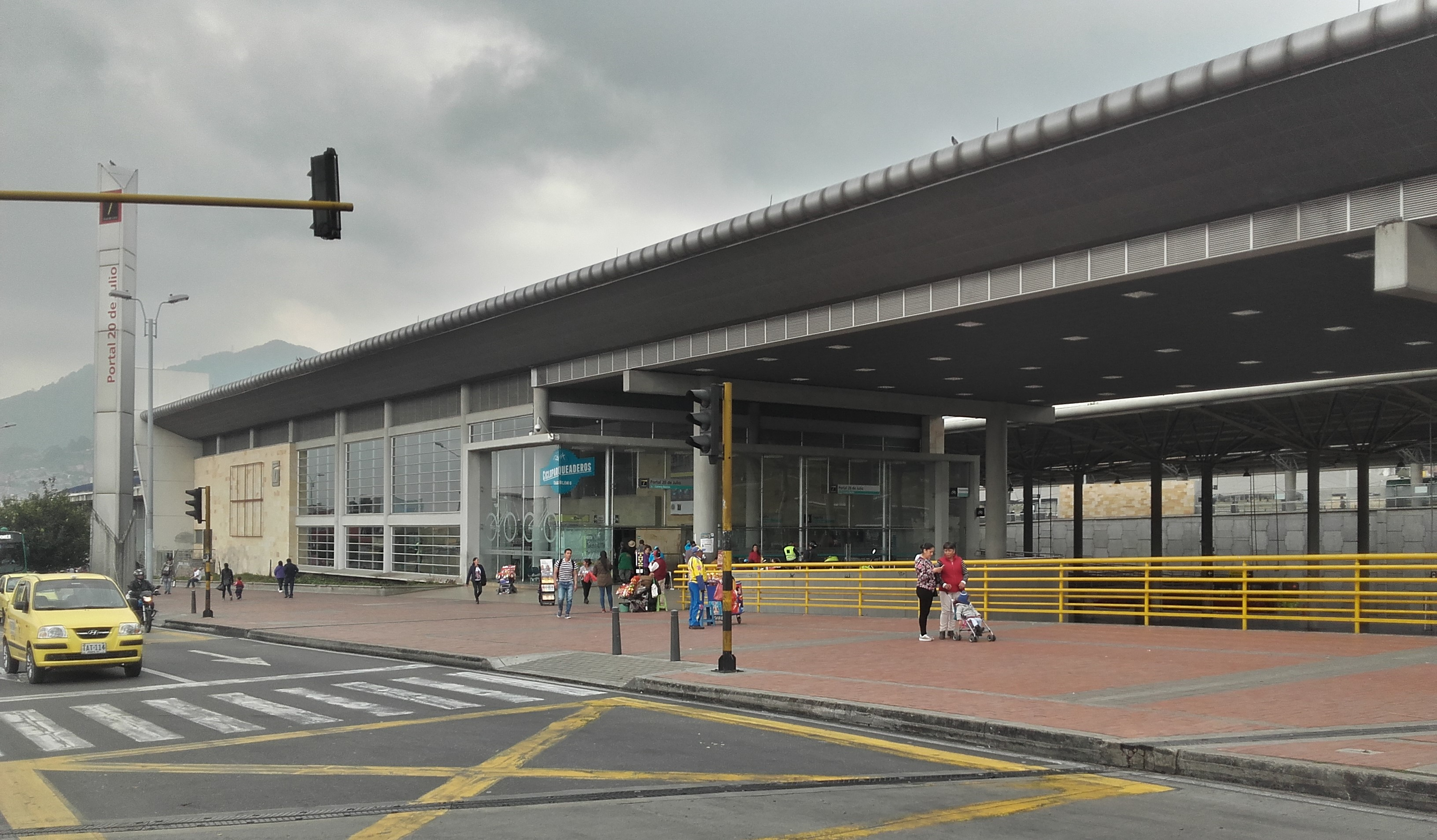

General information
- Location: Carrera 5A with Calle 31 Sur; San Cristóbal
- Coordinates: 4°33′54″N 74°05′49″W
- Line: Carrera Décima
- Platforms: 1

History
- Opened: September 15, 2012

Services
Preceding station	TransMilenio	Following station
Country Sur towards San Diego	L	Terminus
Location

The Portal 20 de Julio It is one of the terminal or head stations that are part of the TransMilenio mass transit system in Bogotá, inaugurated in 2000. It is located in the San Cristóbal, in the southeast of the city, on Carrera 5A between Calle 30A Sur and Calle 32 Sur. It has easy pedestrian access on Calle 31 Sur.

== Location ==
It is located in the southeast of the city. It serves the neighborhoods of Suramérica, Veinte de Julio, San Isidro, Villa de los Alpes I, Bello Horizonte, and their surrounding areas. Nearby are Serafina Park, the Suramérica and Florentino González schools, the Divino Niño Parish, and the SuperCADE 20 de Julio.

== Origin of the name ==
The Portal 20 de Julio gets its name from being the head station of the Line L (Carrera Décima) of TransMilenio, and of the Veinte de Julio neighborhood.

== History ==
This station is part of Phase III of TransMilenio, which began construction in late 2009 and was put into service along with the Carrera Décima trunk line in September 2012.

It was developed on a site that formerly housed the Moore pipe factory.

The station has two platforms for the system's buses, an access building, an administrative building, and a fairground consisting of a basement, two floors, and a plaza. In addition, a bus depot with capacity for 56 articulated buses and 126 bi-articulated buses was built, along with a bicycle parking facility with space for 256 bicycles.

In October 2023, construction began on the TransMiCable, whose central station will be located within the Portal 20 de Julio. It will feature a new platform to allow connection between the TransMilenio system and the cable car line.

== Station services ==
=== Main services ===
Services provided since June 30, 2012
Type	Routes to the West	Routes to the North
Easy route		2
Express services every day all day		B18 C25
Express services Monday to Saturday all day	K10	
Routes that end the journey
Easy route	2	
Express services every day all day	L18 L25	
Express services Monday to Saturday all day	L10	

=== TransMiCable ===
Type	Line	Length	Terminals	Number of stations	Type of station	Fleet
Cable Car (Under construction)		2,80 km	20 de Julio - Altamira	3	1 at ground level and 2 elevated	144 cabins

=== Dual services ===
Services provided since June 14, 2014
Type	Routes to the North	Routes to the South
Dual every day all day	D81 M82	L81 L82

=== Scheme ===
South →
Feeder arrival			13.10	13-8	13.7L820	13.12	13.6	13.9	13-13
			Feeder Platform			Bridge			
← North		Bridge	← North			Bridge	← North		
	C25	Bridge		K10		Bridge			Arrival of trunk lines
Platform 1		Bridge		Platform 1		Bridge		Platform 1	
Arrival of trunk lines	2			M82		Bridge	B18		D81
South →							South →		
					Carrera 5A				

=== Feeder services ===
On November 17, 2012, the feeder routes based at this portal began operating.

- 13.6 circular route to the Juan Rey neighborhood.
- 13.7 circular route to the Peninsula neighborhood.
- 13-8 circular route to the Altamira neighborhood.
- 13.9 circular to the Tihuaque neighborhood.
- 13.10 circular route to the Villa del Cerro neighborhood.
- 13.12 circular route to the Los Libertadores neighborhood.
- 13.13 circular route to the Resurrección neighborhood.
- L820 circulate to the San Isidro II neighborhood.

=== Urban services ===
The following urban routes also operate in the same way SITP on the outer sides of the station, circulating on the mixed traffic lanes on Carrera 5A, with the possibility of transferring using the tarjeta TuLlave:

SITP bus stops
Código	Sector	Dirección	Rutas
048A13	L Portal 20 de Julio	KR 5 - CL 31 Sur	13-8H723L155L331L800L805L812 114A 740 P7 786
