= Parque =

Parque is the Galician, Portuguese and Spanish word for "park", and may refer to:

- Parque (TransMilenio), a metro station in Bogotá, Colombia
- Parque (Lisbon Metro), in Portugal
- Parque (Santurce), a subbarrio in San Juan, Puerto Rico
- Battle of Parque (1912), in Morelos, Mexico
- Jim Parque (born 1975), American baseball player

== See also ==
- Parquetry, a type of flooring
- Park (disambiguation)
