= Parque (TransMilenio) =

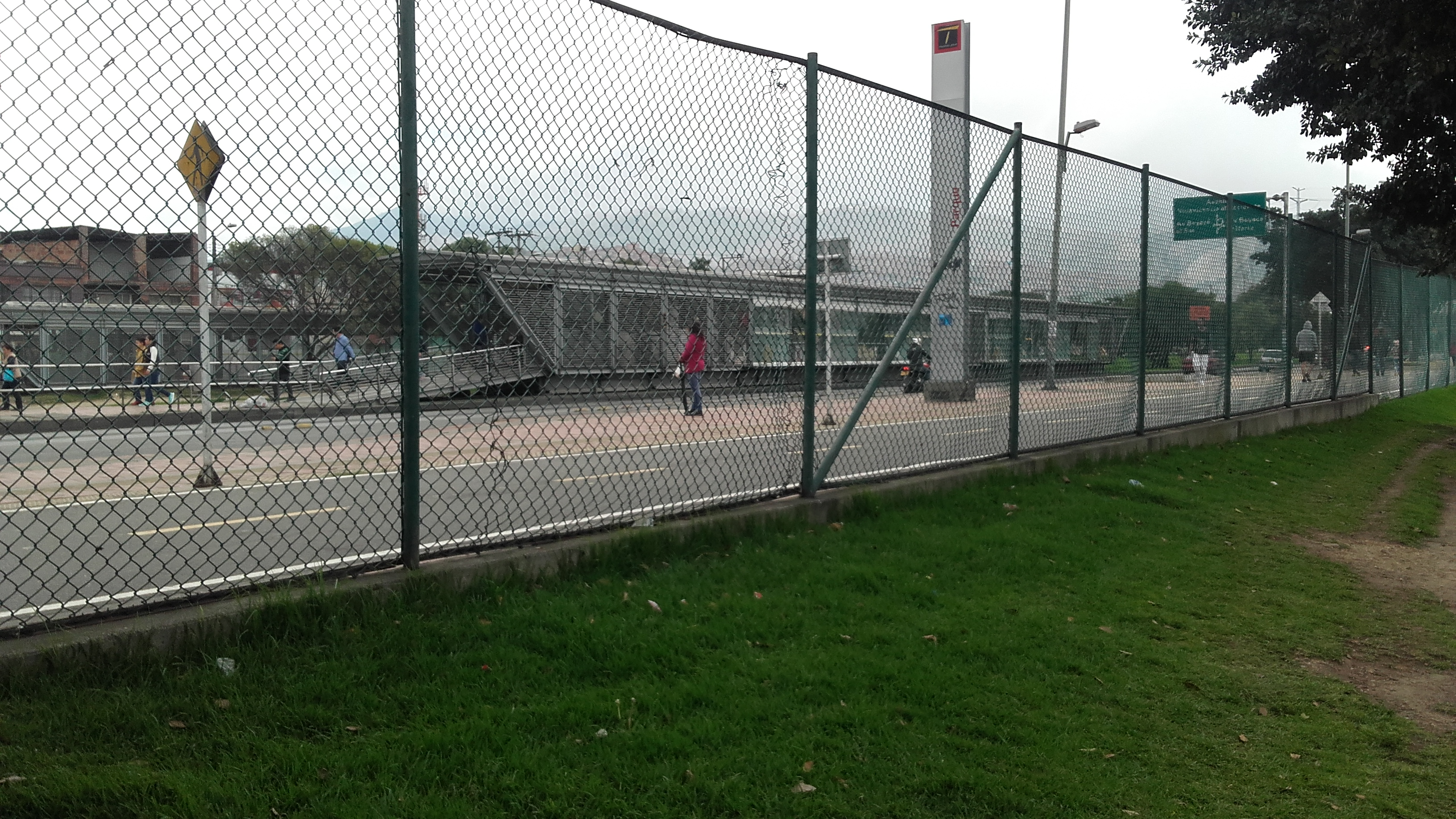

General information
- Location: Av.Carrera 19C with Calle 55 Sur; Tunjuelito neighborhood
- Line(s): Caracas Sur - Tunal
- Platforms: 2

History
- Opened: February 16, 2002

Services
Preceding station	TransMilenio	Following station
Biblioteca towards Tercer Milenio	H	Portal del Tunal towards Portal de Usme or Portal del Tunal

The simple station Parque is a part of the TransMilenio mass-transit system of Bogotá, Colombia, opened in the year 2000.

== Location ==
The station is located in southern Bogotá, facing the Parque El Tunal, from which it gets its name. Specifically, it is located on Avenida Ciudad de Villavicencio with Calle 55 Sur.

== History ==
In 2002, a few months after the opening of the Portal del Norte, the Avenida Ciudad de Villavicencio line was opened, including this station.

== Station services ==
=== Old trunk services ===
Services rendered until April 29, 2006
Kind	Routes	Frequency
Current	3 Portal Norte	Every 3 minutes on average

=== Current Trunk Services ===
Service as of April 29, 2006
Type	Northern Routes	Southern Routes
Express Every day All day	C15	H15
Express Monday through Saturday; All day	D21	H21

=== Feeder routes ===
This station does not have connections to feeder routes.

=== Inter-city service ===
This station does not have inter-city service.

== See also ==
- Bogotá
- TransMilenio
- List of TransMilenio Stations
