= San Cristóbal, Bogotá =

San Cristóbal
- Locality of Bogotá
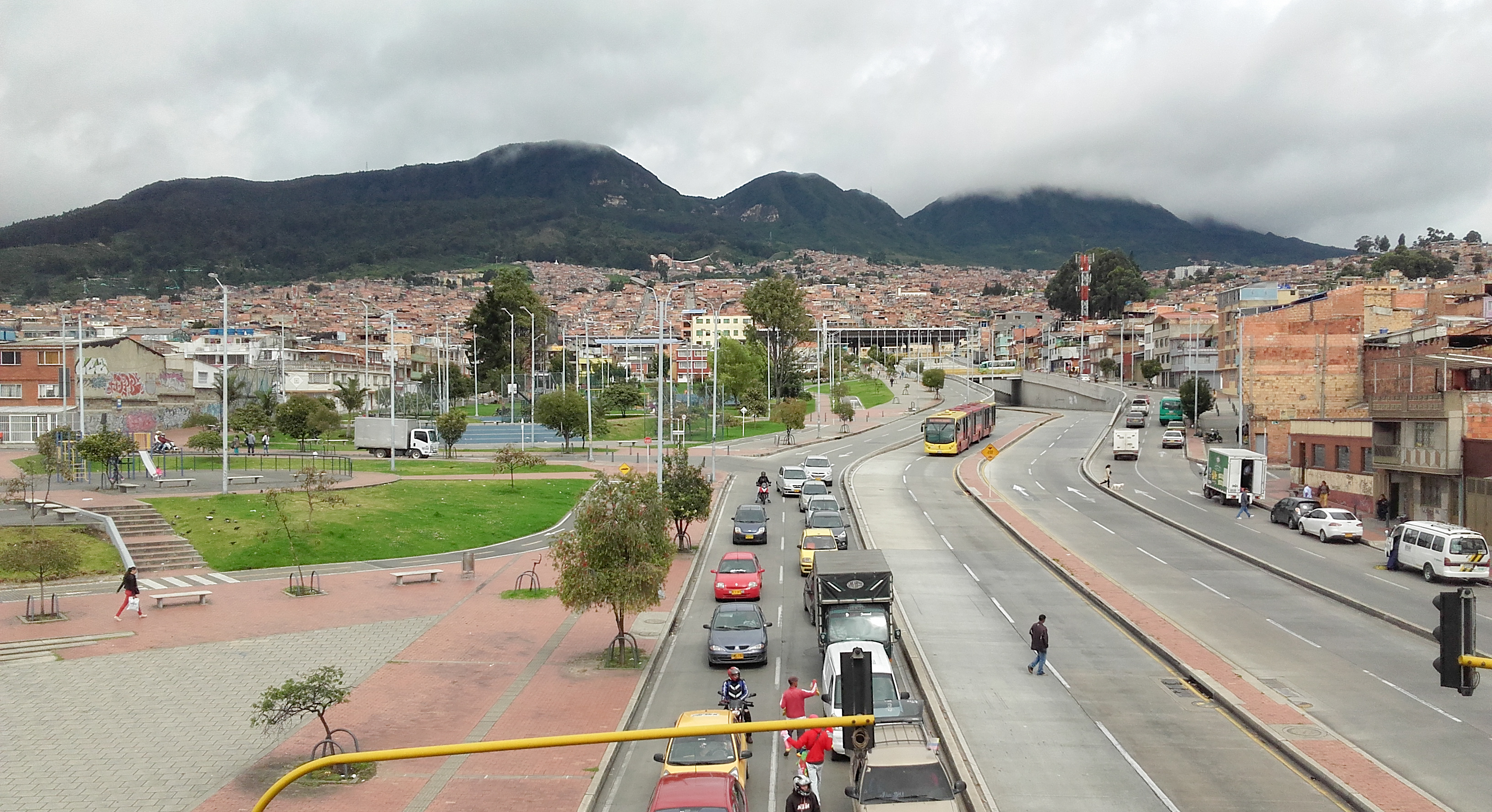

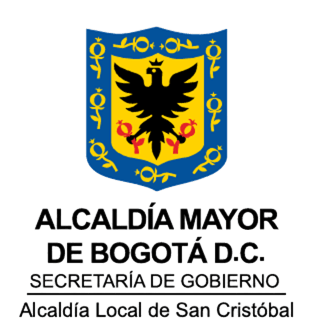
- Seal

- Location of the locality in the city of Bogotá

- Location of the locality in the Capital District of Bogotá
- Coordinates: 4°33′53″N 74°05′00″W
- Country: Colombia
- City: Bogotá
- Neighbourhoods: List: Veinte de Julio (Bogotá)

Area
  - Total: 49.09 km^{2} (18.95 sq mi)
- Elevation: 2,600 m (8,500 ft)

Population (2007)
  - Total: 404,350
  - Density: 8,237/km^{2} (21,330/sq mi)
- Time zone: UTC-5 (Colombia Standard Time)
- Website: Official website

San Cristóbal, (English: Saint Christopher), also known as San Cristóbal Sur to distinguish it from a neighborhood in Usaquén, is the fourth locality of Bogotá, capital of Colombia. It is located in the southeast of Bogota. This district is mostly inhabited by lower class residents.

== General information ==
=== Borders ===
- North: Santa Fe locality
- South: The locality of Usme
- East: The municipality of Ubaque, Cundinamarca
- West: The localities of Los Mártires and Antonio Nariño

=== Hydrology ===
The Fucha River originates from the Eastern Hills in the east of the locality and is known as the San Cristóbal River while forming the locality's border.

=== Topography ===
Bogotá's southeastern corner, including eastern San Cristóbal, rise into the city's Eastern Hills. The western side of the locality on the Bogotá savanna is relatively flat.

=== Transportation ===
The main transit artery is Calle 22 Sur, which is also known as Avenida Primero de Mayo. Other important roads are Calle 11 Sur, the Eastern Highway which connects the municipalities located to Bogotá's southeast, Carrera 10, and the extension of Avenida Circunvalar in the Eastern Hills.

=== Points of interest ===
- Divino Niño (Divine Child) church, located in the Veinte de Julio neighborhood
- San Cristóbal and Gaitán Cortés (Columnas Park) metropolitan parks
- The Entrenubes (between the clouds) natural park
- The Primero de Mayo bike path
- La Victoria community center, which has a pool and cultural center

=== Neighborhoods ===
The neighborhoods of San Cristóbal are: San Cristóbal, Barcelona, Columnas, Corinto, La Castaña, La Gran Colombia, La María, Montecarlo, Quinta Ramos, San Pedro, Aguas Claras, La Belleza, Buenos Aires, Canadá, El Triángulo, Granada Sur, Juan Rey, La Victoria, Las Mercedes, Los Alpes, Los Libertadores, Malvinas, Miraflores, Nariño Sur, Los Pinares, Quindío, Ramajal, Sagrada Familia, San Blas, San Isidro, San José Sur Oriental, Santa Inés Sur Oriental, Sociego, Suramérica, La Gloria, Veinte de Julio, Villa de los Alpes, Villa Javier, and Vitelma.
