= Parque Municipal do Relvão (Angra do Heroísmo) =

Park on Terceira Island in the Azores

Coordinates: 38.6513°N 27.2235°W

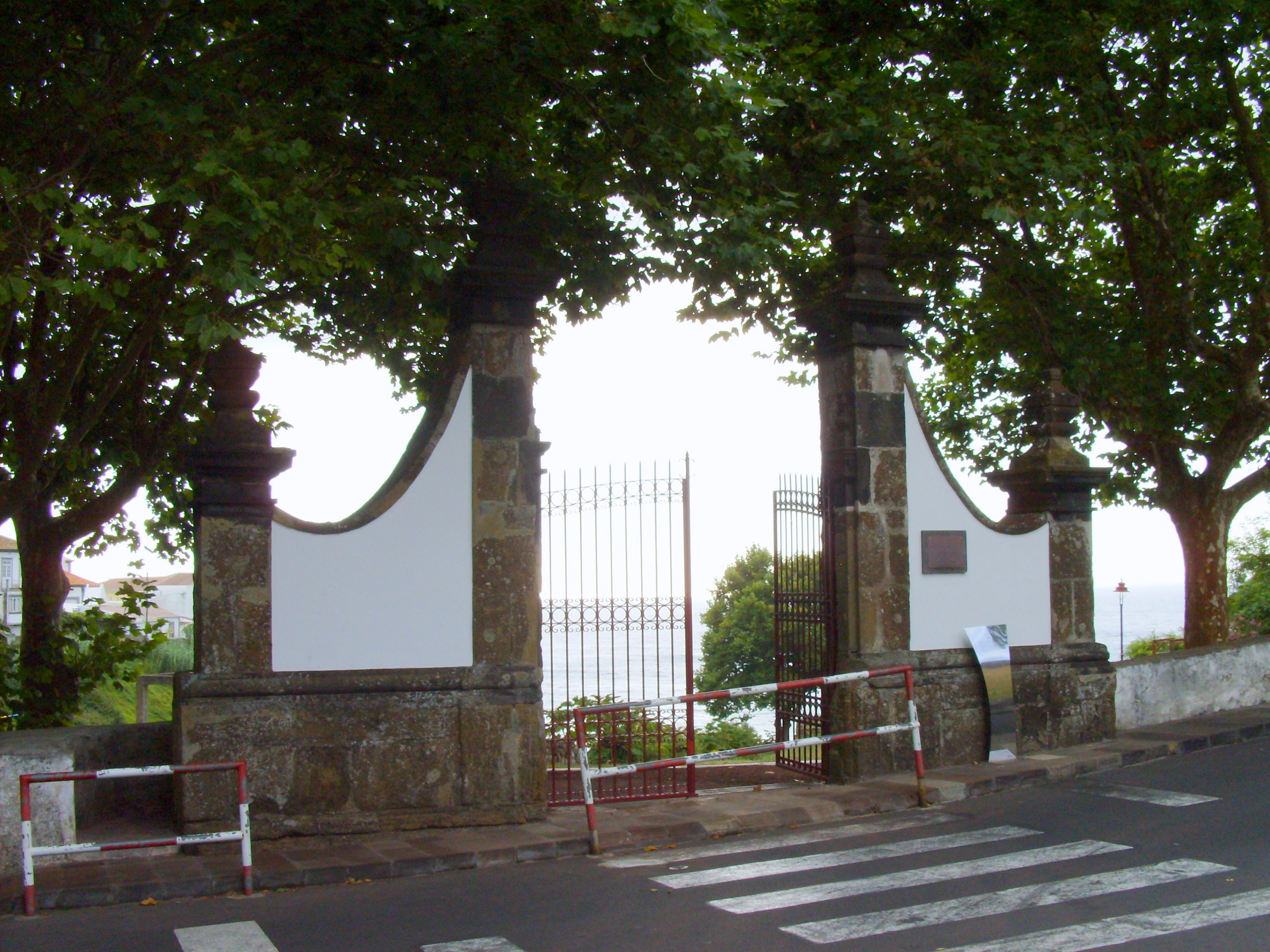
Historic gate at Parque do Relvão, Angra do Heroísmo.

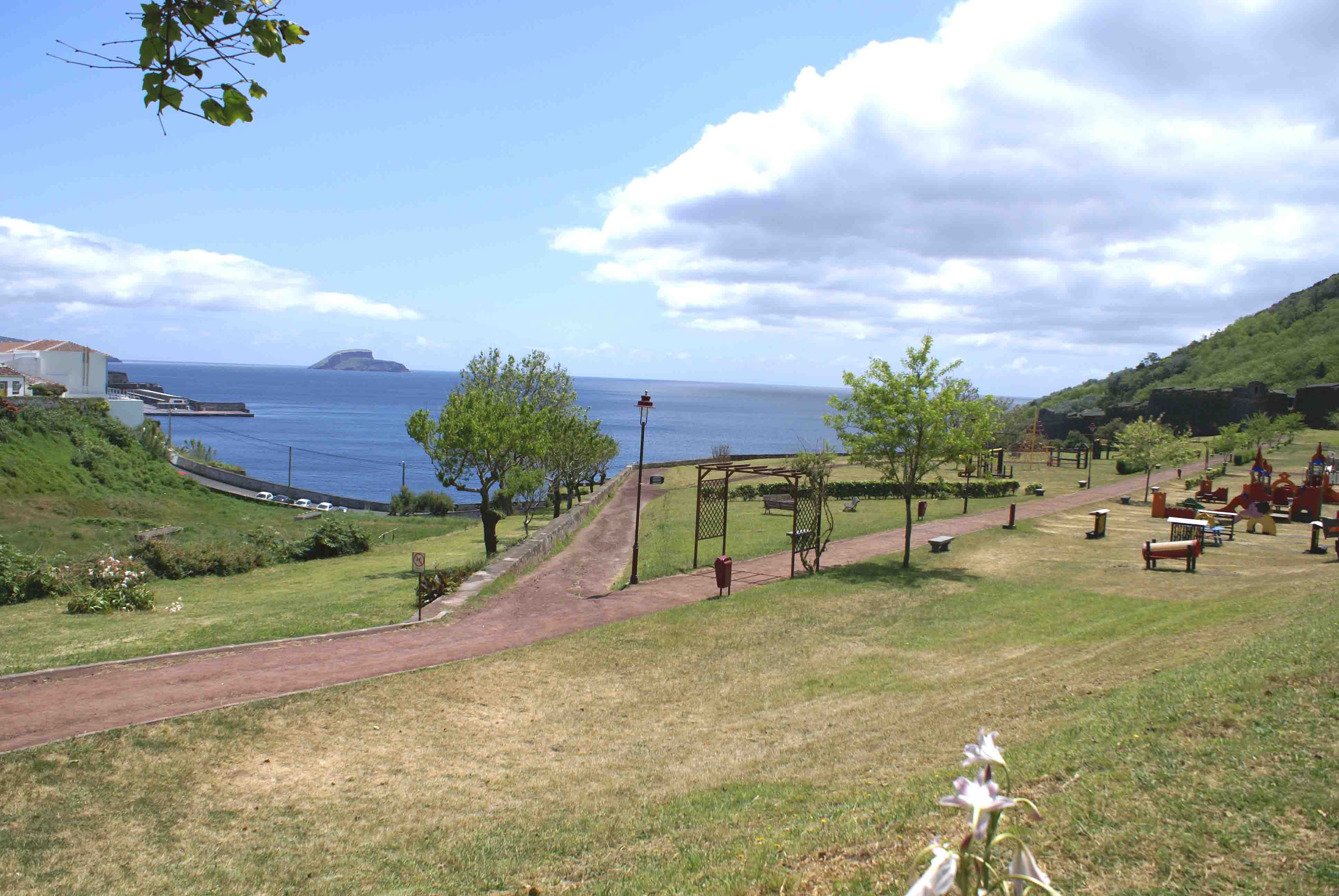
Parque do Relvão, Angra do Heroísmo.

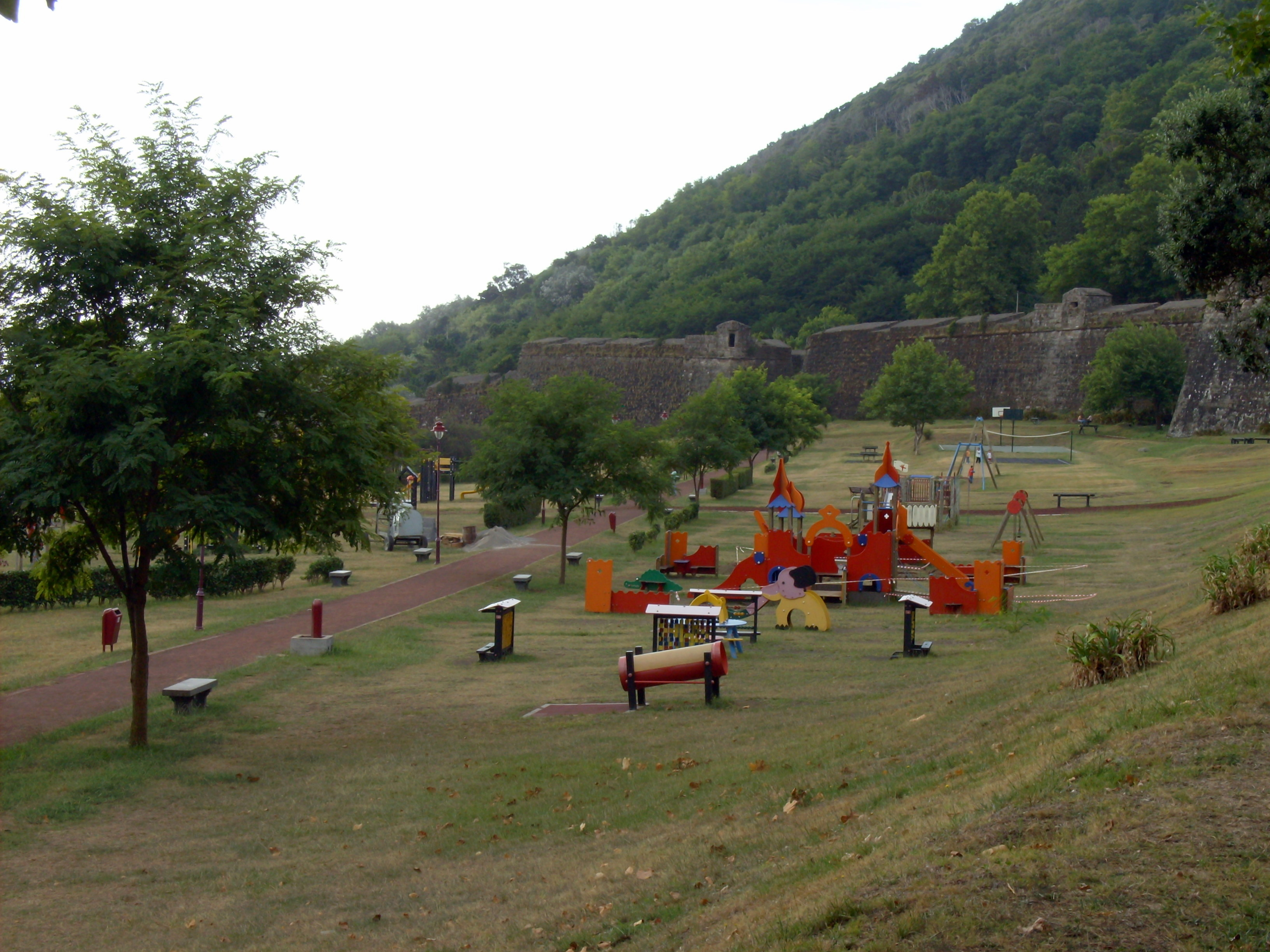
Children's playground at Parque do Relvão, Angra do Heroísmo.

Parque Municipal do Relvão is a park in the Azores. It is located at the foot of the eastern slope of Monte Brasil, in the parish of Sé, within the historic centre of Angra do Heroísmo, Terceira Island, in the Azores.

The park stretches from the Fortress of São João Baptista walls to the Bay of Angra, in a historically significant location. The area, also known as "Relvão", once served as a military training ground during the Liberal Wars (1828–1834) and as a site for punishments and executions by firing squad, notably following orders from the Provisional Junta after the Battle of Pico do Seleiro (4 October 1828).

Following the arrival of the Count of Vila Flor and Pedro IV of Portugal in Terceira, the Relvão field was mainly used for military parades. Gradually, the Liberal Army was formed. This army subsequently departed for São Miguel Island, and from there, it moved on to Mindelo Landing, near Porto.

Nowadays, the park is an important leisure area, with numerous facilities including volleyball and basketball courts, a walking/running trails, a children's playground with different toys and more.

== See also ==
- Angra do Heroísmo
- Sé

== Bibliography ==
- Raposo, Francisco Hipólito (1998). Descubra Portugal: Açores e Madeira [Discover Portugal: Azores and Madeira.] (in Portuguese). Ediclube.
- Bastos, Hélder; et al. (et al.) (2004). História das freguesias e concelhos de Portugal [History of parishes and municipalities in Portugal] (in Portuguese).
