= Veinte de Julio, Bogotá =

Veinte de Julio
- Barrio
- Interactive map of Veinte de Julio
- Country: Colombia
- Department: Distrito Capital
- City: Bogotá

Veinte de Julio is a neighbourhood (barrio) of Bogotá, Colombia.
