= Bogotá =

Capital and largest city of Colombia

- Capital city
- Bogotá, Distrito Capital
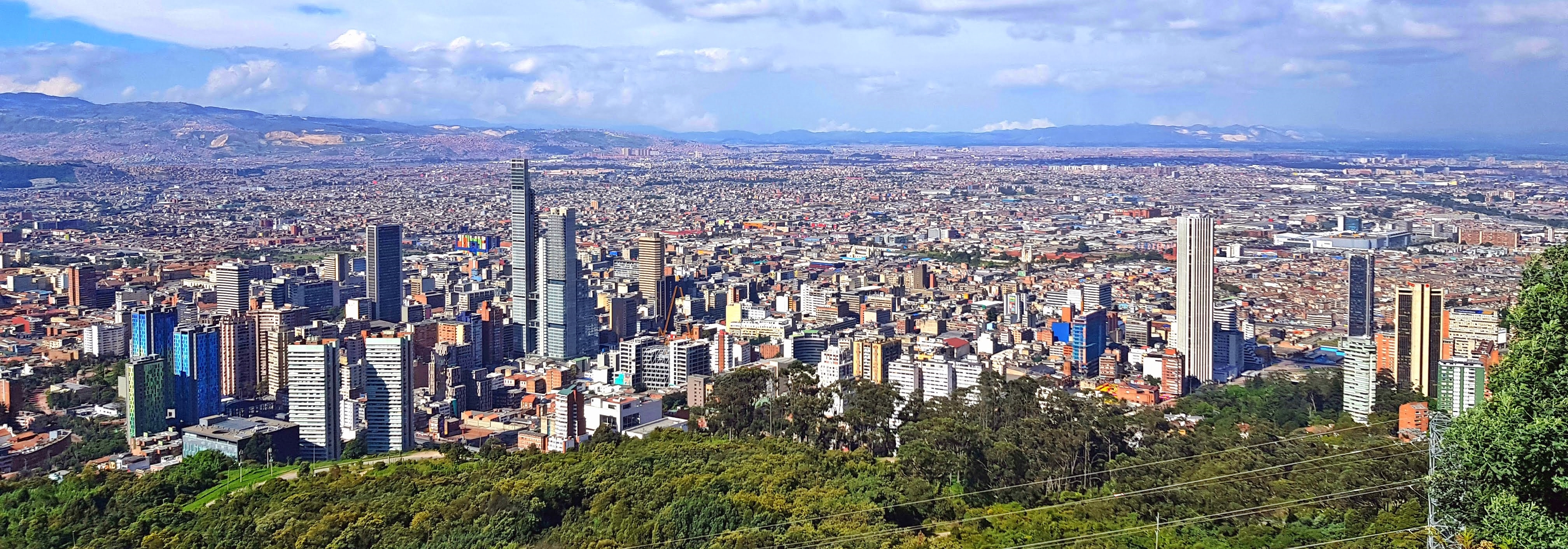
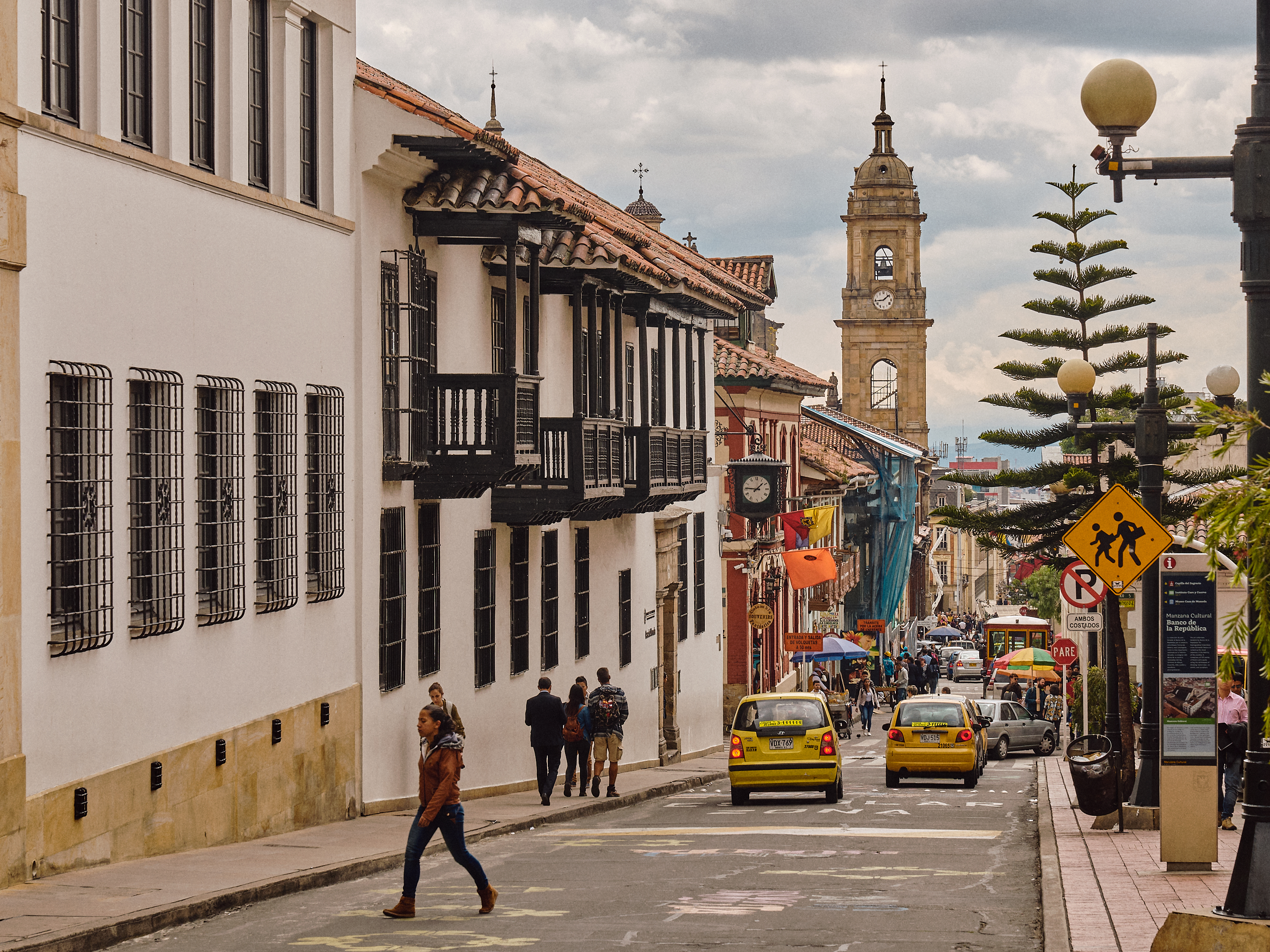
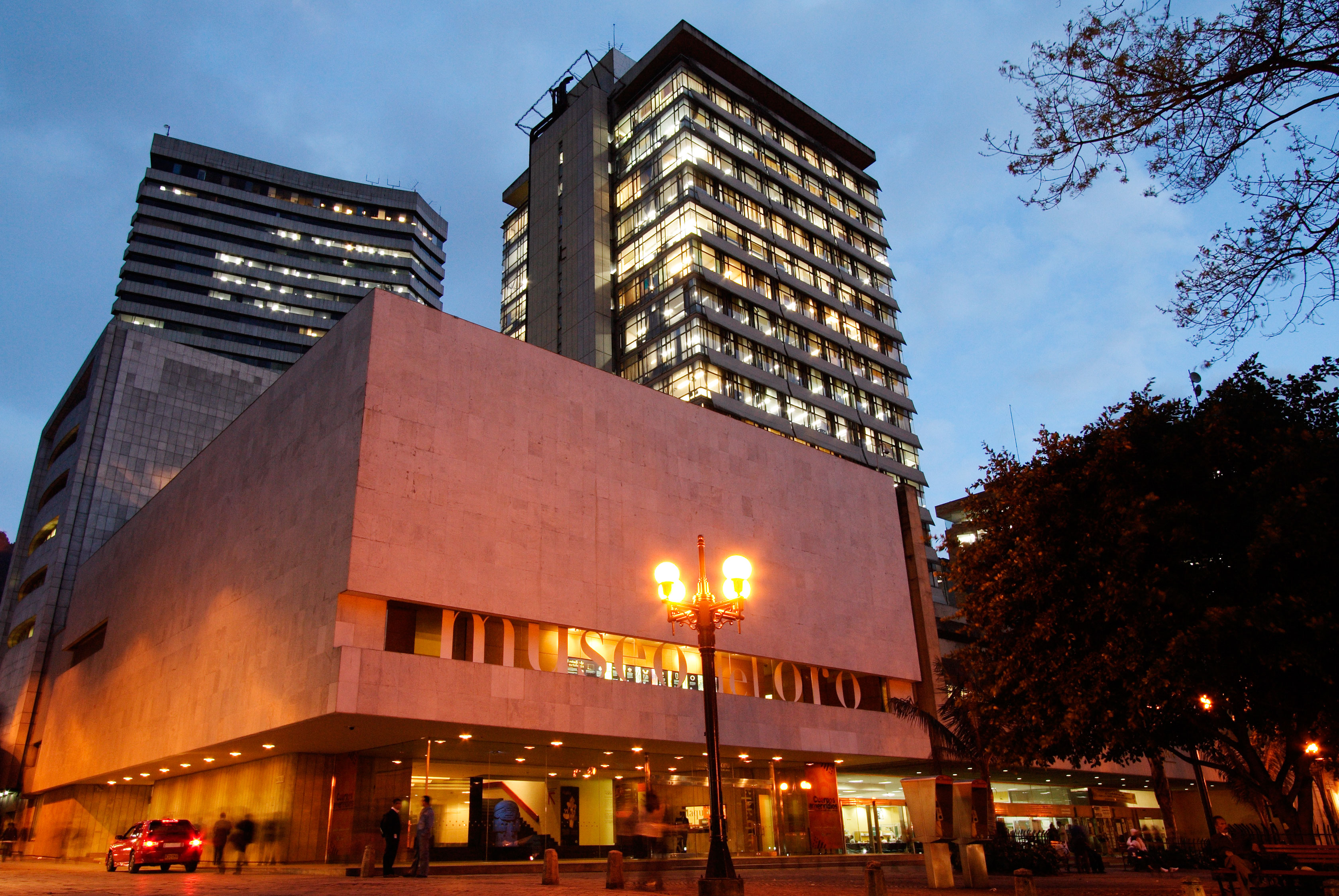
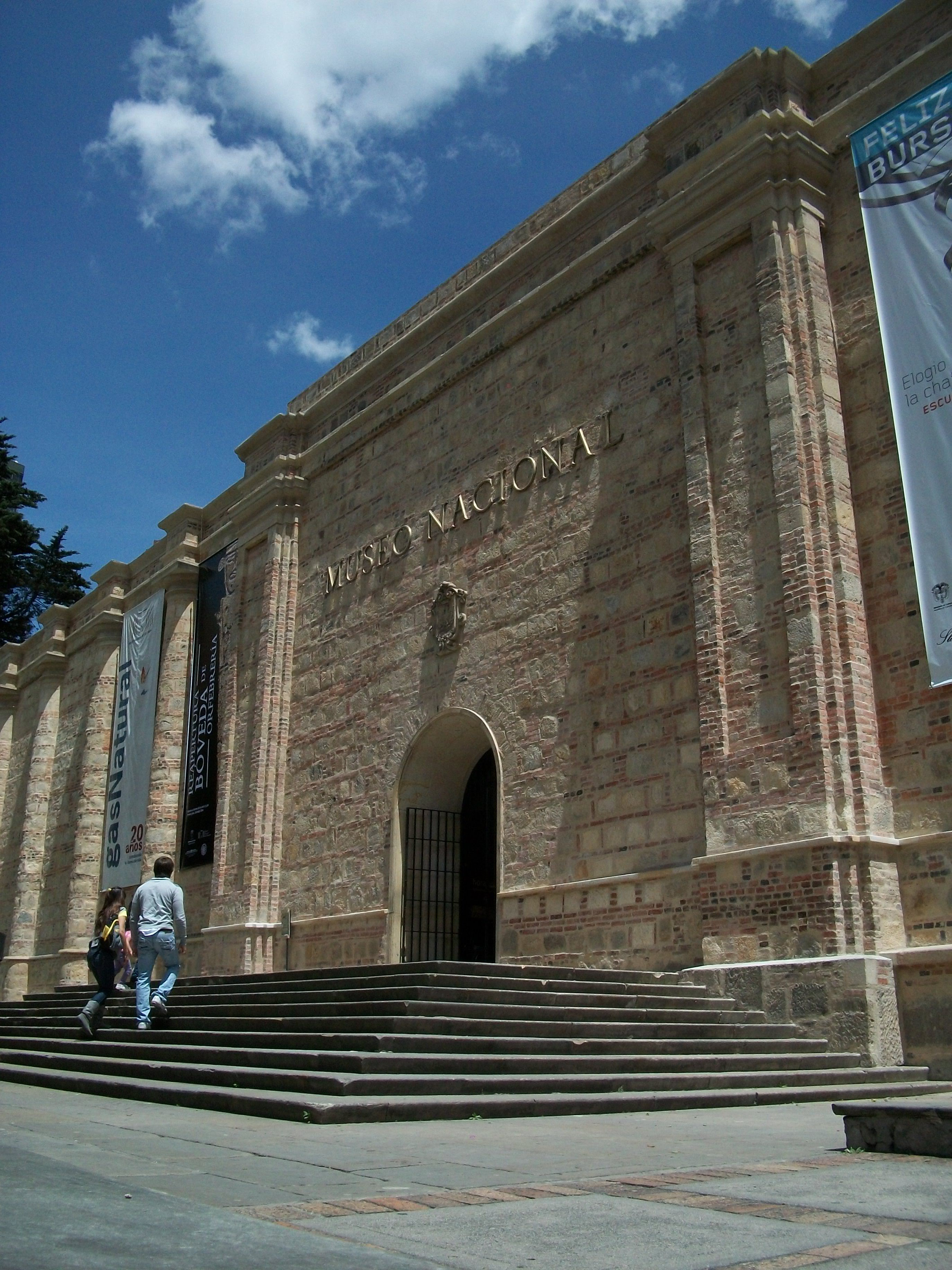
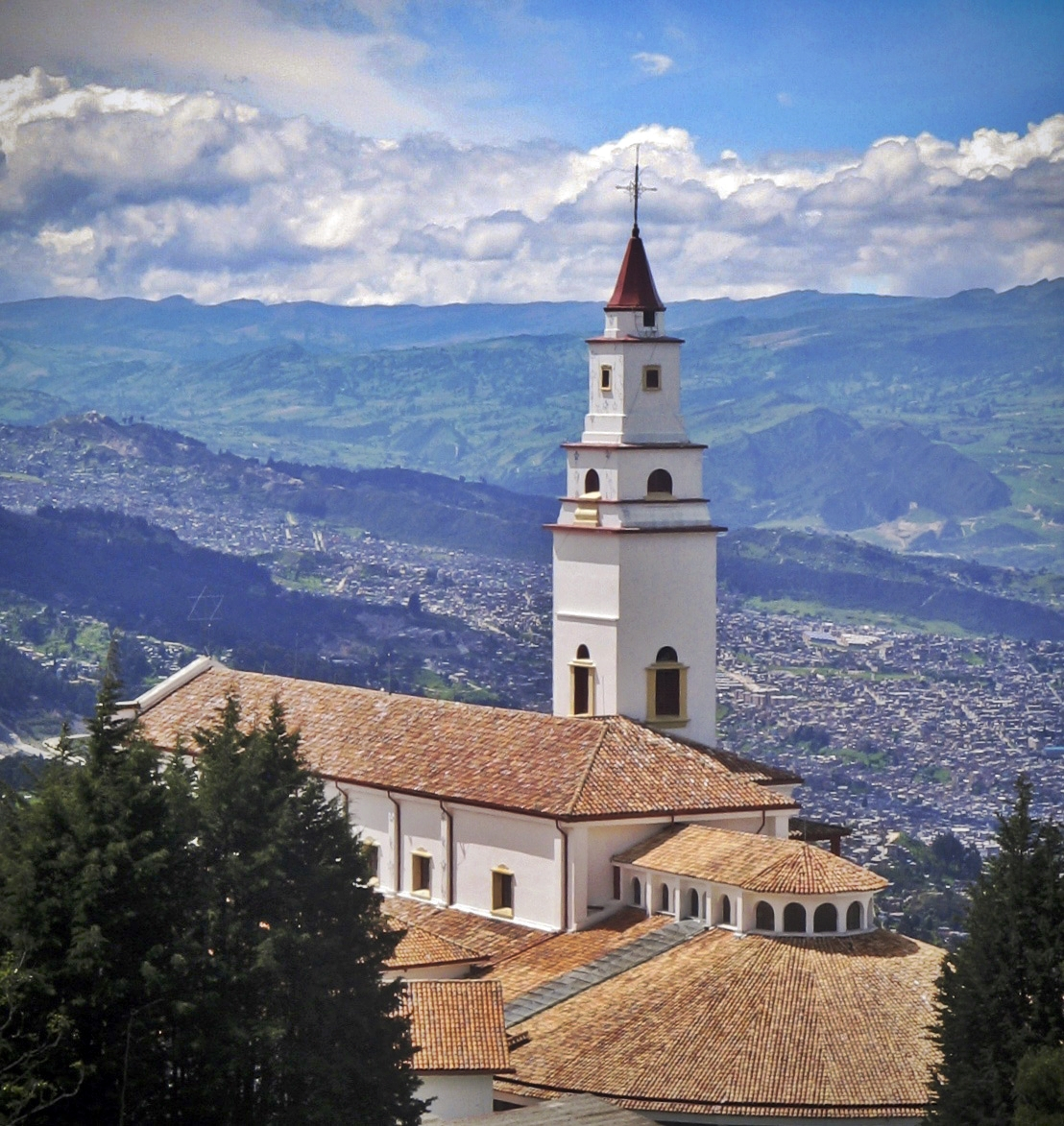
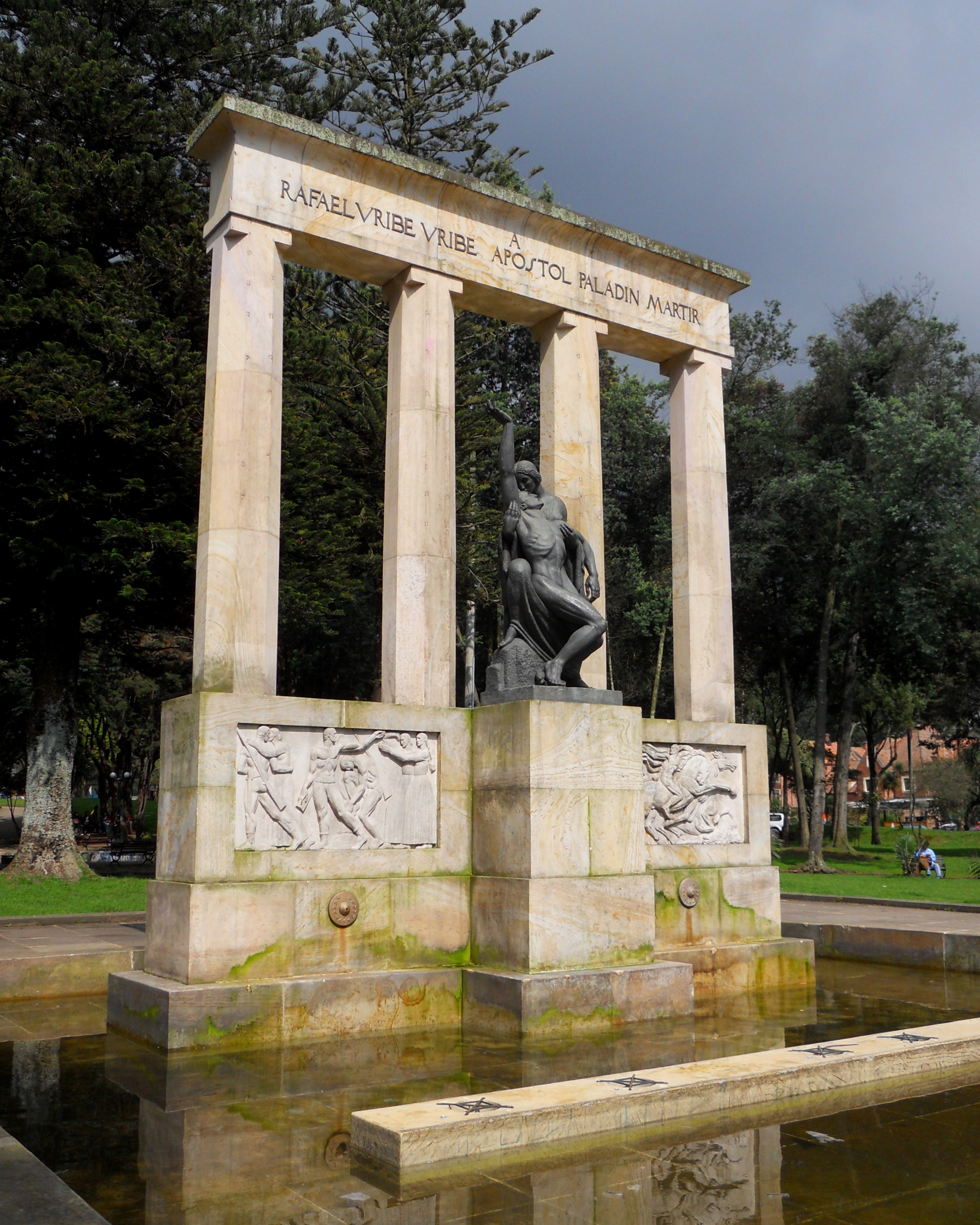
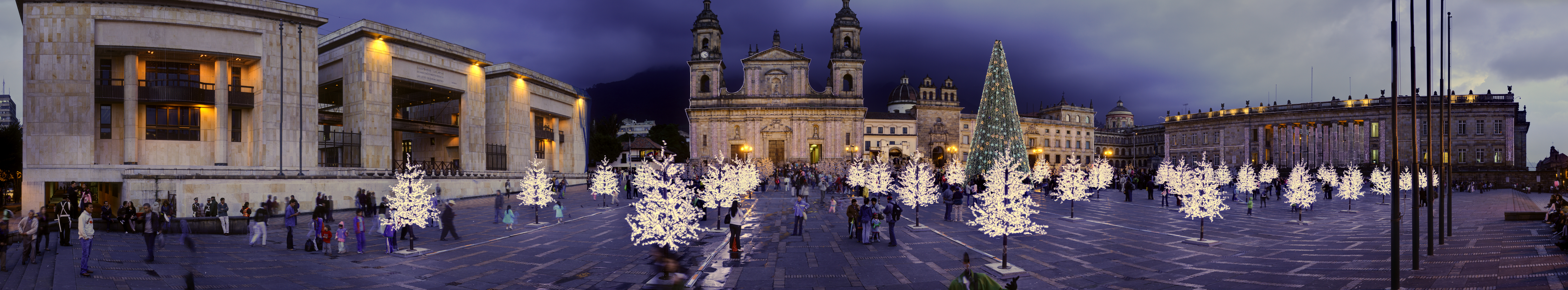
- Skyline of the International District of Bogotá with the tallest buildings in Colombia La Candelaria Gold Museum National Museum Monserrate Sanctuary National Park Bolívar Square, with Palace of Justice (left), Primatial Cathedral (center) and National Capitol (right)

- Flag Coat of arms Wordmark
- Nicknames: "La Atenas Suramericana" ("The South American Athens") "La Ciudad de Todos" ("The City of Everyone") "La Nevera" ("The Fridge") "La Capital Mundial del Teatro" ("The Theater Capital of the World") "Muy Noble y Muy Leal Ciudad " ("The Noblest and Most Loyal City")
- Motto: "Bogotá Reverdece" ("Bogotá Green", 2020–2023)
- Anthem: Himno de Bogotá (Anthem of Bogotá)
- Location of Bogotá
- Interactive map of Bogotá
- Location in Colombia and South America Bogotá (South America)
- Coordinates: 4°42′40″N 74°4′20″W
- Country: Colombia
- Department: Capital District
- Founded: 1538: Pre-Colonial times (600–800AD): Bacatá; 6 August 1538: Santa Fe de Bogotá
- Founder: Gonzalo Jiménez de Quesada

Government
  - Mayor: Carlos Fernando Galán (2024–2027)

Area
  - Capital city: 1,587 km^{2} (613 sq mi)
  - Urban: 307.36 km^{2} (118.67 sq mi)
  - Rank: 32nd
- Elevation: 2,640 m (8,660 ft)

Population (2022)
  - Capital city: 8,034,649
  - Rank: 5th in the Americas; 3rd in South America; 1st in Colombia
  - Density: 5,061/km^{2} (13,107/sq mi)
  - Urban: 7,968,095
  - Urban density: 26,500/km^{2} (68,700/sq mi)
  - Metro: 11,658,211
- Demonym(s): Bogotan bogotano, -na, rolo, -la (informal), cachaco, -ca (informal) (es)

GDP (Nominal, 2026)
  - Metro: US$182.2 billion
  - Per capita: US$17,500
- Time zone: UTC-05:00 (COT)
- Postal code: 11XXXX
- Area code: +57 601
- HDI: 0.835 very high · 1st of 33
- Largest locality by area: Sumapaz – 780.96 square kilometres (301.53 sq mi)
- Largest locality by population: Suba (1,218,213 – 2015 est)
- Largest locality by GDP: Chapinero – US$54 billion
- Primary Airport: El Dorado International Airport; BOG (Major/International)
- Secondary Airport: CATAM none (Military); Guaymaral Airport none (Private Activities)
- Bus rapid transit: TransMilenio
- Bike Paths: R2-R29
- Rapid Transit: Bogotá Metro (first line expected to start service in 2028)
- Tramway: TransMiCable; Trams in Bogotá; Teleférico de Monserrate
- Website: bogota.gov.co

The Bogotá savanna is the high plateau in the Andes where Bogotá is located. The flatlands are clearly visible in the topography and the result of a Pleistocene lake; Lake Humboldt, that existed until around 30,000 years BP

Bogotá (/ˌboʊɡəˈtɑː/, also UK: /ˌbɒɡ-/, US: /ˈboʊɡətɑː/, Spanish pronunciation: [boɣoˈta]) (Note: Officially Bogotá, Distrito Capital, abbreviated Bogotá, D.C., and formerly known as Santa Fe de Bogotá (Note: The 1991 Constitution of Colombia refers to Bogotá as the Capital District of Bogotá (Distrito Capital de Bogotá) in Article 176, as Santa Fe de Bogotá in Article 324, as the Capital District of Santa Fe de Bogotá (Distrito Capital de Santa Fe de Bogotá) in Transitional Article 41, and simply as Bogotá in Article 322.) (Spanish: [ˌsanta ˈfe ðe βoɣoˈta]; lit. 'Holy Faith of Bogotá') during the Spanish Imperial period and between 1991 and 2000.) is the capital and largest city of Colombia. The city is administered as the Capital District, as well as the capital of, though not politically part of, the surrounding department of Cundinamarca. Bogotá is a territorial entity of the first order, with the same administrative status as the departments of Colombia. It is the main political, economic, administrative, industrial, cultural, aeronautical, technological, scientific, medical, educational and airport center of the country and northern South America.

Bogotá was founded as the capital of the New Kingdom of Granada on 6 August 1538 by Spanish conquistador Gonzalo Jiménez de Quesada after a harsh expedition into the Andes conquering the Muisca, the indigenous inhabitants of the Altiplano. Santafé (its name after 1540) became the seat of the government of the Spanish Royal Audiencia of the New Kingdom of Granada (created in 1550), and then after 1717 it was the capital of the Viceroyalty of New Granada. After the Battle of Boyacá on 7 August 1819, Bogotá became the capital of the independent nation of Gran Colombia. It was Simón Bolívar who rebaptized the city with the name of Bogotá, as a way of honoring the Muisca people and as an emancipation act towards the Spanish crown. Hence, since the Viceroyalty of New Granada's independence from the Spanish Empire and during the formation of present-day Colombia, Bogotá has remained the capital of this territory.

The city is located in the center of Colombia, on a high plateau known as the Bogotá savanna, part of the Altiplano Cundiboyacense located in the Eastern Cordillera of the Andes. Its altitude averages 2,640 meters (8,660 ft) above sea level, making it the third highest capital city in the world. Subdivided into 20 localities, Bogotá covers an area of 1,587 square kilometers (613 square miles) and enjoys a consistently cool climate throughout the year.

The city is home to central offices of the executive branch (Office of the President), the legislative branch (Congress of Colombia) and the judicial branch (Supreme Court of Justice, Constitutional Court, Council of State and the Superior Council of Judicature) of the Colombian government. Bogotá stands out for its economic strength and associated financial maturity, its attractiveness to global companies and the quality of human capital. It is the financial and commercial heart of Colombia, with the most business activity of any city in the country. The capital hosts the main financial market in Colombia and the Andean natural region, and is the leading destination for new foreign direct investment projects coming into Latin America and Colombia. It has the highest nominal GDP in the country, responsible for almost a quarter of the nation's total (24.7%).

The city's airport, El Dorado International Airport, named after the mythical El Dorado, handles the largest cargo volume in Latin America, and is third in number of passengers. Bogotá is home to the largest number of universities and research centers in the country, and is an important cultural center, with many theaters, libraries (Virgilio Barco, Tintal, and Tunal of BibloRed, BLAA, National Library, among more than 1000) and museums. Bogotá ranks 52nd on the Global Cities Index 2014, and is considered a global city type "Alpha-" by GaWC.

== Toponymy ==
The name of Bogotá corresponds to the Spanish pronunciation of the Chibcha Bacatá (or Muyquytá) which was the name of a neighboring settlement located between the modern towns of Funza and Cota. There are different opinions about the meaning of the word Muyquytá, the most accepted being that it means "walling of the farmland" in the Chibcha language. Another popular translation argues that it means "The Lady of the Andes". Others suggest that Bacatá was the name of the Muisca cacique who governed the land before the Spaniards arrived. Jiménez de Quesada gave the settlement the name of "Our Lady of Hope" but the Spanish crown gave it the name of Santafé (Holy Faith) in 1540 when it was appointed as a city. The Muisca, the indigenous inhabitants of the region, called the place on which the city was founded "Thybzaca" or "Old Town".

== History ==
Historical claims

Crown of Castile 1538–1716
Kingdom of Spain 1716–1810
Junta of Santa Fe 1810–1811
(Cundinamarca Department) State of Cundinamarca 1811–1814
United Provinces of New Granada 1814–1816
Kingdom of Spain 1816–1819
(Gran Colombia) Republic of Colombia 1819–1832
Republic of New Granada 1832–1858
Granadine Confederation 1858–1863
United States of Colombia 1863–1886
Republic of Colombia 1886–present

The area of modern Bogotá was first populated by groups of indigenous people who migrated south based on the relation with the other Chibcha languages; the Bogotá savanna was the southernmost Chibcha-speaking group that exists from Nicaragua to the Andes in Colombia. The civilization built by the Muisca, who settled in the valleys and fertile highlands of and surrounding the Altiplano Cundiboyacense (modern-day departments of Cundinamarca and Boyacá and small parts of Santander), was one of the great civilizations in the Americas. The name Muisca Confederation has been given to a loose egalitarian society of various chiefs (caciques) who lived in small settlements of maximum 100 bohíos. The agriculture and salt-based society of the people was rich in goldworking, trade and mummification. The religion of the Muisca consisted of various gods, mostly related to natural phenomena as the Sun (Sué) and his wife, the Moon; Chía, rain Chibchacum, rainbow Cuchavira and with building and feasting (Nencatacoa) and wisdom (Bochica). Their complex luni-solar calendar, deciphered by Manuel Izquierdo based on work by Duquesne, followed three different sets of years, where the sidereal and synodic months were represented. Their astronomical knowledge is represented in one of the few extant landmarks of the architecture of the Muisca in El Infiernito outside Villa de Leyva to the north of Bogotá.

=== Pre-Columbian era ===
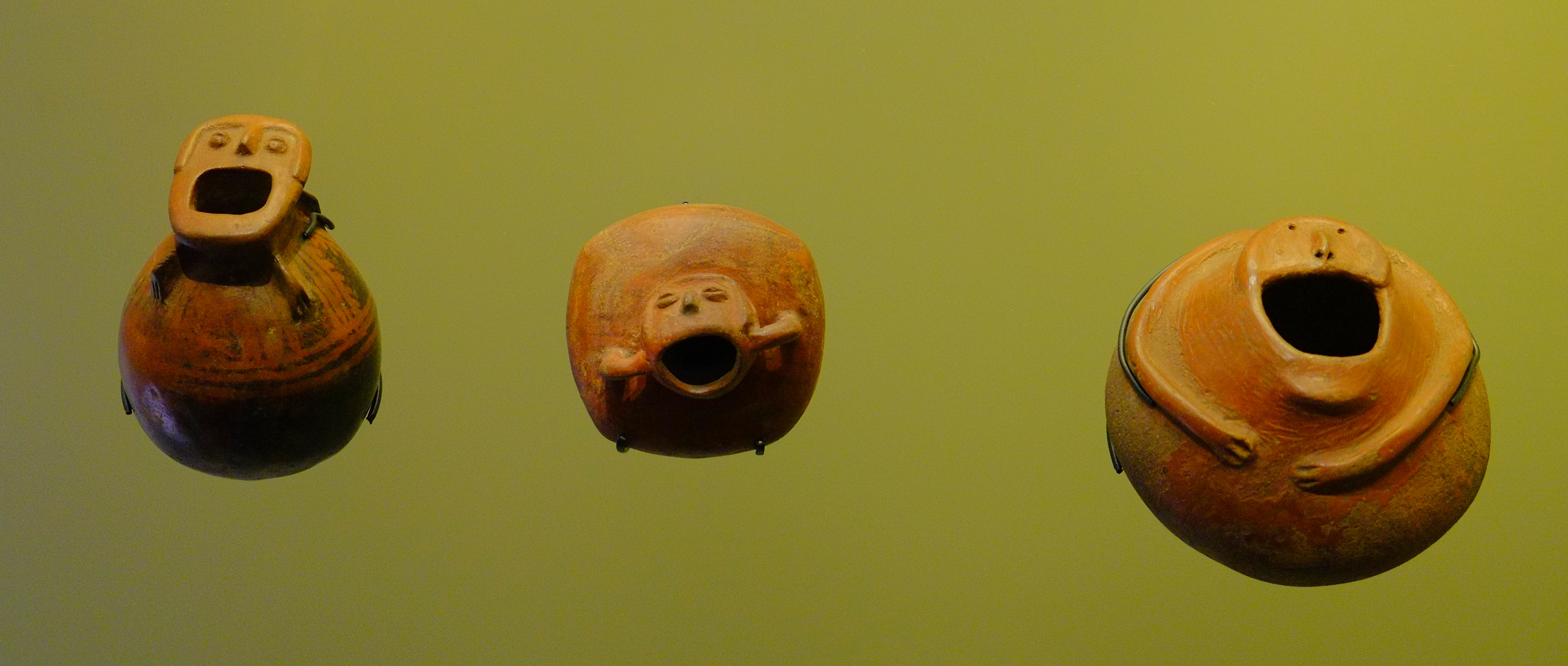
Small ceramic pots filled with food accompanied the mummies in their journey to the afterlife

The first populations inhabiting the present-day Metropolitan Area of Bogotá were hunter-gatherers in the late Pleistocene. Dating to around 12,500 BP, the oldest evidence of human activity was discovered in El Abra, north of Zipaquirá. Other excavations in a rock shelter southwest of the city in Soacha provided ages of ~11,000 BP; Tequendama. Since roughly 0 AD, the local Muisca people domesticated guinea pigs as a source of dietary meat. The people inhabiting the Bogotá savanna in the late 15th century were the Muisca, speaking Muysccubun, a member of the Chibcha language family. Muisca means "people" or "person", making "Muisca people", how they are called, a tautology. At the arrival of the Spanish conquistadores, the Muisca population was estimated to be half a million indigenous people on the Bogotá savanna, and up to two million in the Muisca Confederation. They occupied the highland and mild climate flanks between the Sumapaz Mountains to the southwest and Cocuy's snowy peak to the northeast, covering an approximate area of 25,000 km^{2} (9,653 sq mi), comprising Bogotá's high plain, a large portion of the modern-day department of Boyacá department portion and a small area in the Santander region.

Trade was the most important activity of the Muisca with other Chibcha-speaking neighbours, such as the Guane, Lache and U'wa and with Cariban-speaking groups such as the Muzo or "Emerald People". Their knowledge of salt production from brines, a task devoted exclusively to Muisca women, gave them the name of "Salt People". Tropical fruits that did not grow on the cool highlands, as well as coca, cotton and gold were all traded at markets that took place every Muisca week; every four days. At these frequent markets, the Muisca obtained various luxury goods that appear worthless in a modern sense, as well as precious metals and gemstones that seem valuable to us and which became abundant and were used for various purposes. The Muisca warrior elite were allowed to wear feathered crowns, from parrots and macaws whose habitat was to the east of the Andes; the Arawakan-speaking Guayupe, Tegua and Achagua.

The Muisca cuisine consisted of a stable and varied diet of tubers, potatoes and fruits. Maize was the main ingredient of the Muisca, cultivated on elevated and irrigated terraces. Many words exist in Muysccubun for maize, corn and the various types and forms of it. The product was also the base for chicha; the alcoholic beverage of the people, still sold in central Bogotá today. It was the beverage used to celebrate the construction of houses, harvests and sowing, ritual practices around the various sacred sites of the Altiplano, music and dances, trade at special fairs with farther away trading indigenous groups of Colombia and to inaugurate the new highest regarded member of the community; zipas, zaques, caciques and the religious ruler iraca from Sacred City of the Sun Sugamuxi.

=== Gonzalo Jiménez de Quesada expedition and Spanish conquest ===
From 1533, a belief persisted that the Río Grande de la Magdalena was the trail to the South Sea, to Peru, legendary El Dorado. Such was the target of Gonzalo Jiménez de Quesada, the Granadanian conquistador who left Santa Marta on 6 April 1536 with 800 soldiers, heading towards the interior of current Colombia. The expedition divided into two groups, one under Quesada's command to move on land, and the other commanded by Diego de Urbino would go upriver in four brigantine ships to eventually meet Quesada's troops at the site named Tora de las Barrancas Bermejas. When they arrived, they heard news about Indians inhabiting the south and making large salt cakes used to trade for wild cotton and fish. Jiménez de Quesada decided to abandon the route to Peru and cross the mountain in search of salt villages. They saw crops, trails, white salt cakes and then huts where they found corn, yucca and beans. From Tora, the expedition went up the Opón River and found indigenous people wearing very finely painted cotton mantles. When they arrived in Muisca territories in the Andean Plateau, on 9 March 1537, of the expedition leaving Santa Marta, only 162 men were left.

The zipa at the moment of Spanish conquest was Tisquesusa. His main bohío was in a small village called Bacatá with others in Funza and Cajicá, giving name to the present day capital of Colombia. Bacatá was actually located near to the modern location of the city of Funza. A prophecy in his life came true; he would be dying, bathing in his own blood. Defending Funza with a reduced army of guecha warriors against the heavily exhausted but heavily armed strangers, his reign fell in the hands of Gonzalo Jiménez de Quesada and his younger brother Hernán Pérez on 20 April 1537. Upon his death, his brother Sagipa became the last zipa, against the inheritance tradition of the Muisca. Sagipa used to be a main captain for Tisquesusa but quickly submitted to the Spanish rulers. The first encomenderos asked high prices in valuable products and agricultural production from the indigenous people. On top of that epidemics of European viruses razed through the population, of which in current Boyacá 65–85 % of the Muisca were killed within 100 years.

Jiménez de Quesada decided to establish a military campament in the area in 1538, in the site today known as the Chorro de Quevedo square. The foundation was performed by the construction of 12 houses of reed, referring to the Twelve Apostles, and the construction of a preliminary church, also of reed. With the celebration of the first mass in the campament, celebrated by Dominican friar Domingo de las Casas the city was founded with the name of Nuestra Señora de la Esperanza (Our Lady of Hope) on 6 August 1538. Quesada placed his right foot on the bare earth and said simply, "I take possession of this land in the name of the most sovereign emperor, Charles V."

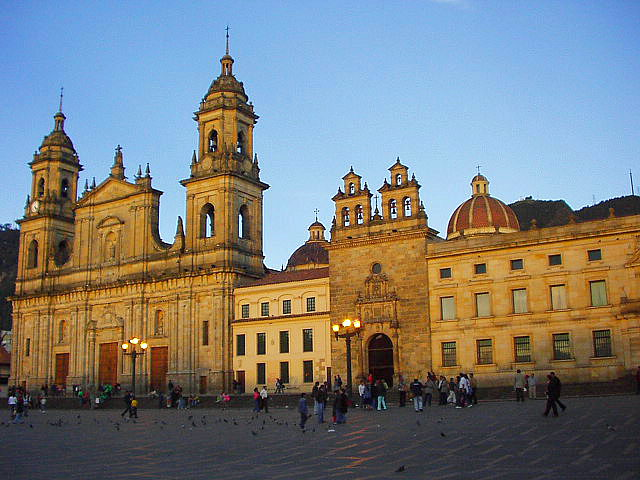
Bolívar Square and the cathedral

This founding, however, was irregular as no town council was formed nor were town officials appointed, as well as lacking some other juridical requirements for an official founding. As a consequence, the official founding only occurred about eight months later, on 27 April 1539, in a site close to one of the recreational lands of the zipa, called Theusa or Theusaquillo. This official founding involved an official ceremony appointing a council and officials, and the demarcation of streets and lands, and in it fellow conquistadores Sebastián de Belalcázar and Nikolaus Federmann were present. While this was the official date of founding, traditionally it is 6 August 1538 that is considered the date of the actual foundation.

The village obtained the title of City by way of a decree from Charles V on 27 July 1540, which changed the name of the city from Our Lady of Hope to Santa Fe (Holy Faith), after the name of a town nearby Granada where Jiménez de Quesada grew up. Jiménez de Quesada and conquerors De Belalcázar and Federmann left for Spain in April 1539, founding Guataquí together on 6 April 1539. The rule over the newly created New Kingdom of Granada was left to Jiménez de Quesada's brother, Hernán Pérez de Quesada. The first mayors of the city were captains Pedro de Arévalo and Jerónimo de Inzar. The city obtained the Title of Muy Noble y Muy Leal (Very Noble and Loyal) on 17 August 1575 by a decree from Phillip II. Bogotá, then called Santa Fe, later became the capital of the later Viceroyalty of New Granada.

=== Spanish colonization ===
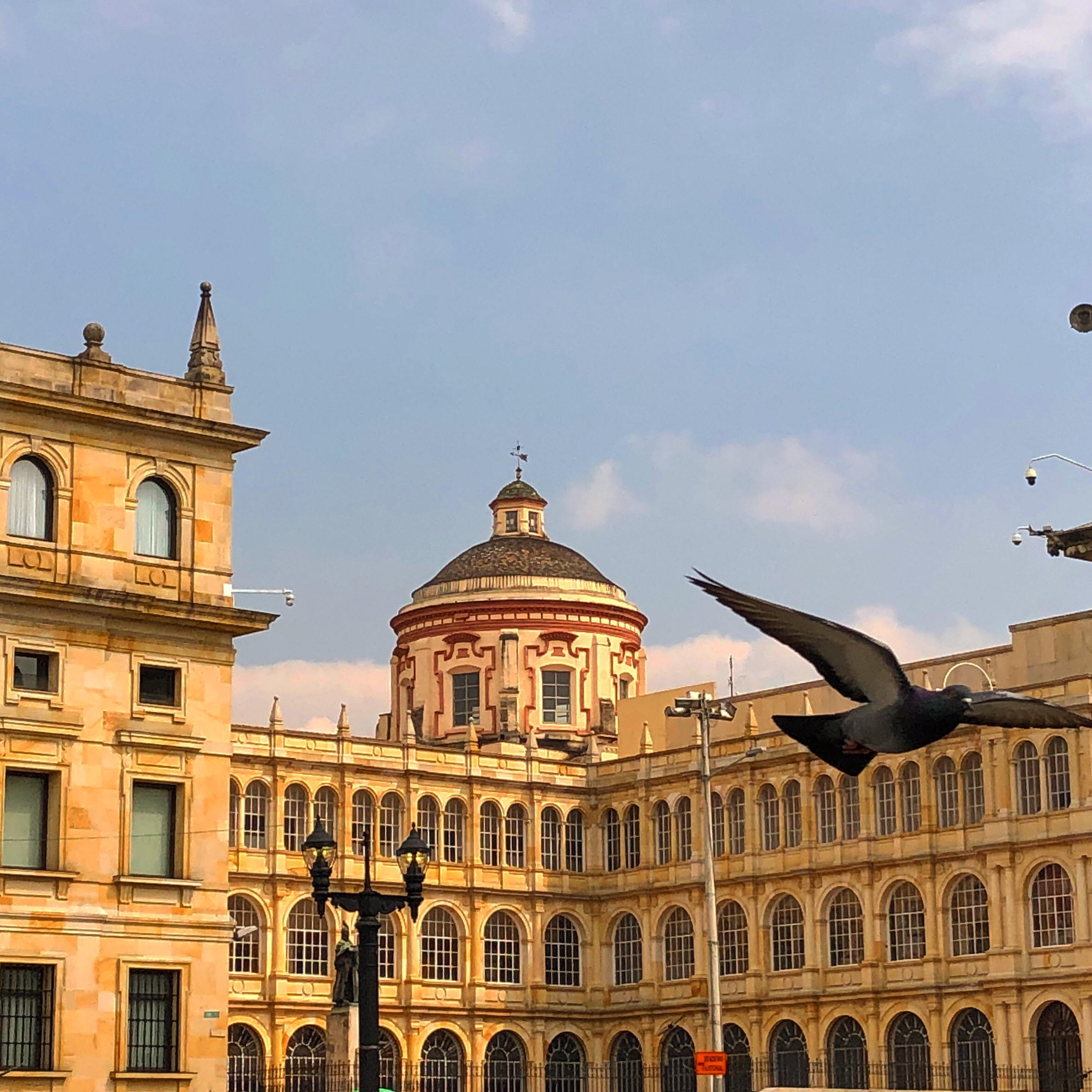
The Plateresque Colonial Colegio Mayor de San Bartolomé, built between 1604 and 1622

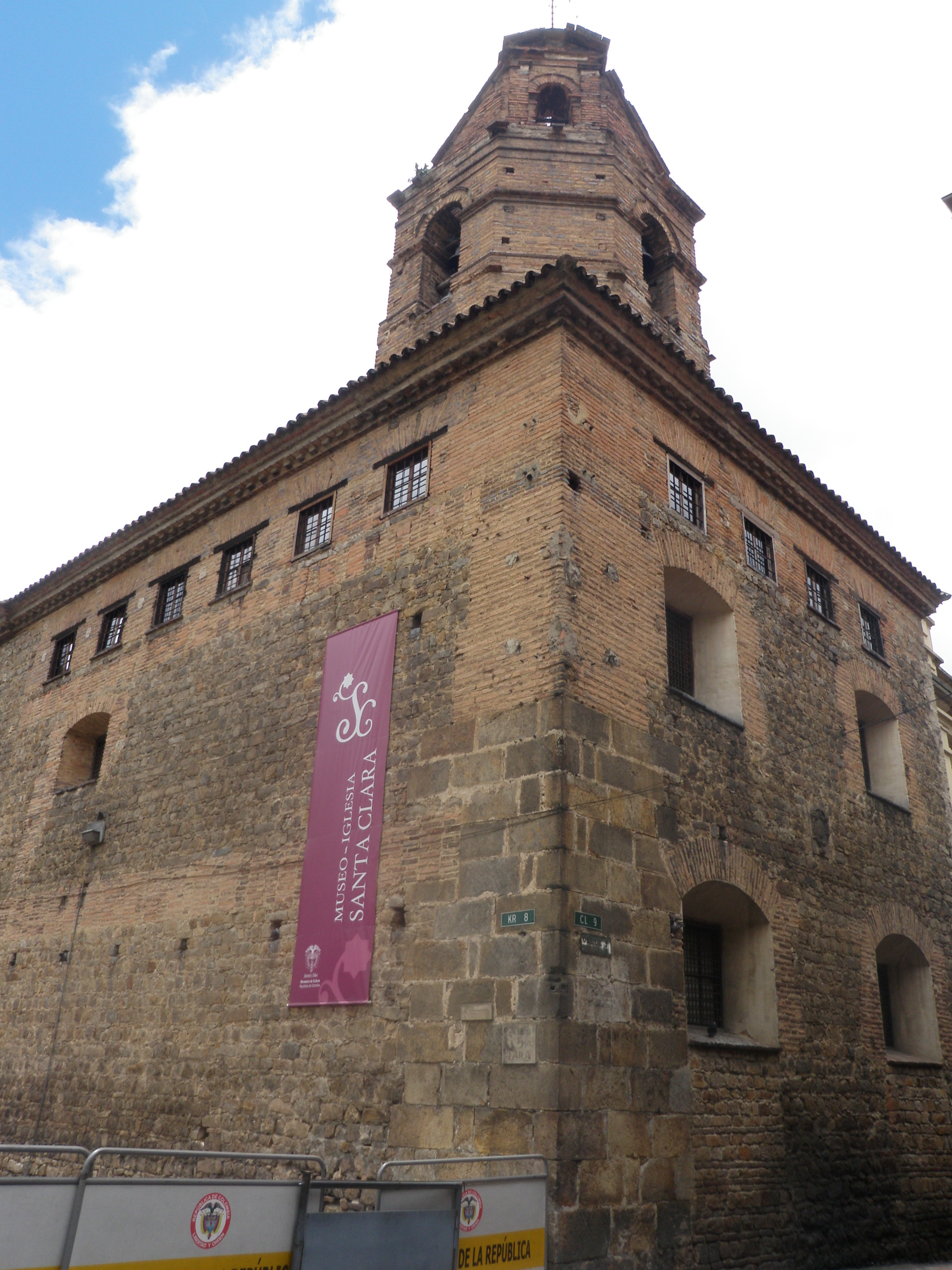
Santa Clara Church Museum built between 1629 and 1647. It has a large collection of colonial Colombian paintings.

The city mayor and the chapter formed by two councilmen, assisted by the constable and the police chief, governed the city. For better administration of these domains, in April 1550, the Audiencia of Santafé was organized. Santa Fe (or Santafé) became the seat of the government of the New Kingdom of Granada. Fourteen years later in 1564, the Spanish Crown designated the first Royal Audiencia chairman, Andrés Díaz Venero de Leyva. The Chapter and the Royal Audience were located on the other side of what is today the Plaza de Bolívar (then called, Plaza Mayor or Major Square). The street connecting the Major Square and the Square of Herbs— now Santander Park— was named Calle Real (Royal Street), now Carrera Séptima (or "Seventh Street"; counted from the mountains to the east of the city). After 1717 Santafé became the capital of the Viceroyalty of New Granada.

Formed by Europeans, mestizos, indigenous people, and slaves, from the second half of the 16th century, the population began to grow rapidly. The 1789 census recorded 18,161 inhabitants, and by 1819 the city population reached 30,000 inhabitants distributed in 195 blocks. Importance grew when the diocese was established.

=== Nineteenth century ===
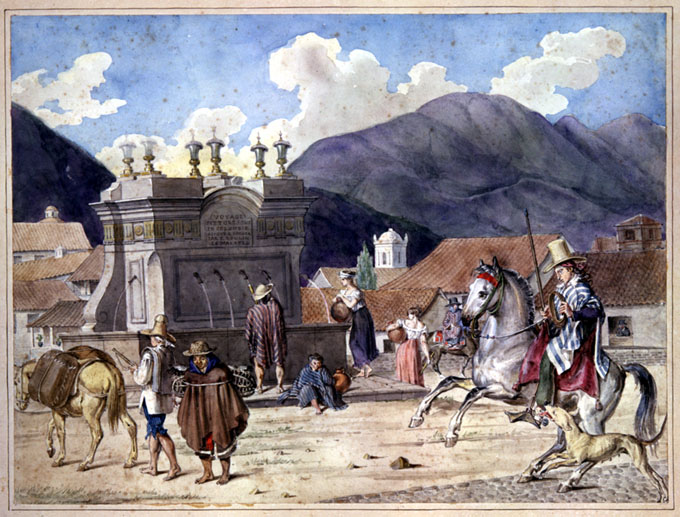
Former colonial Plaza de San Victorino, in Bogotá, painted in 1824 by François Désiré Roulin.

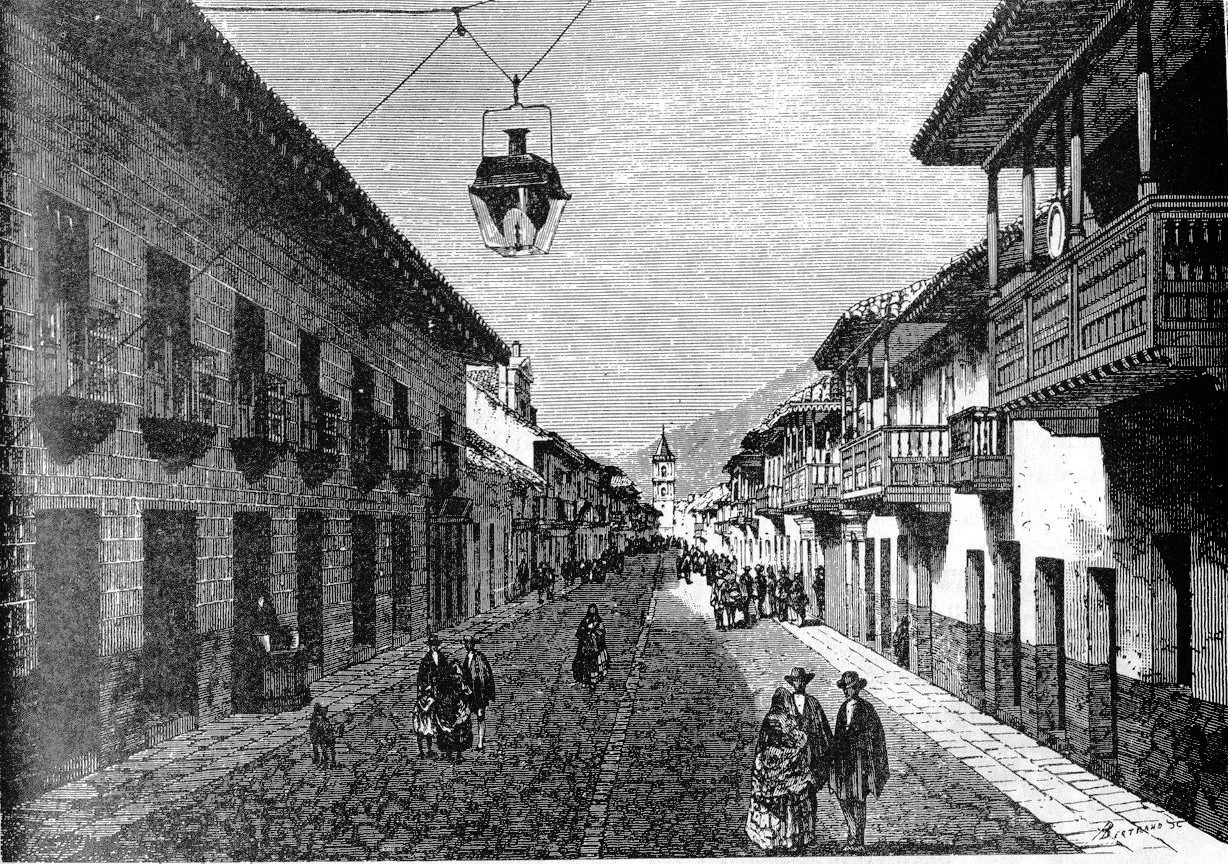
Royal Street (in 1869), today known as Seventh Avenue (Carrera Séptima)

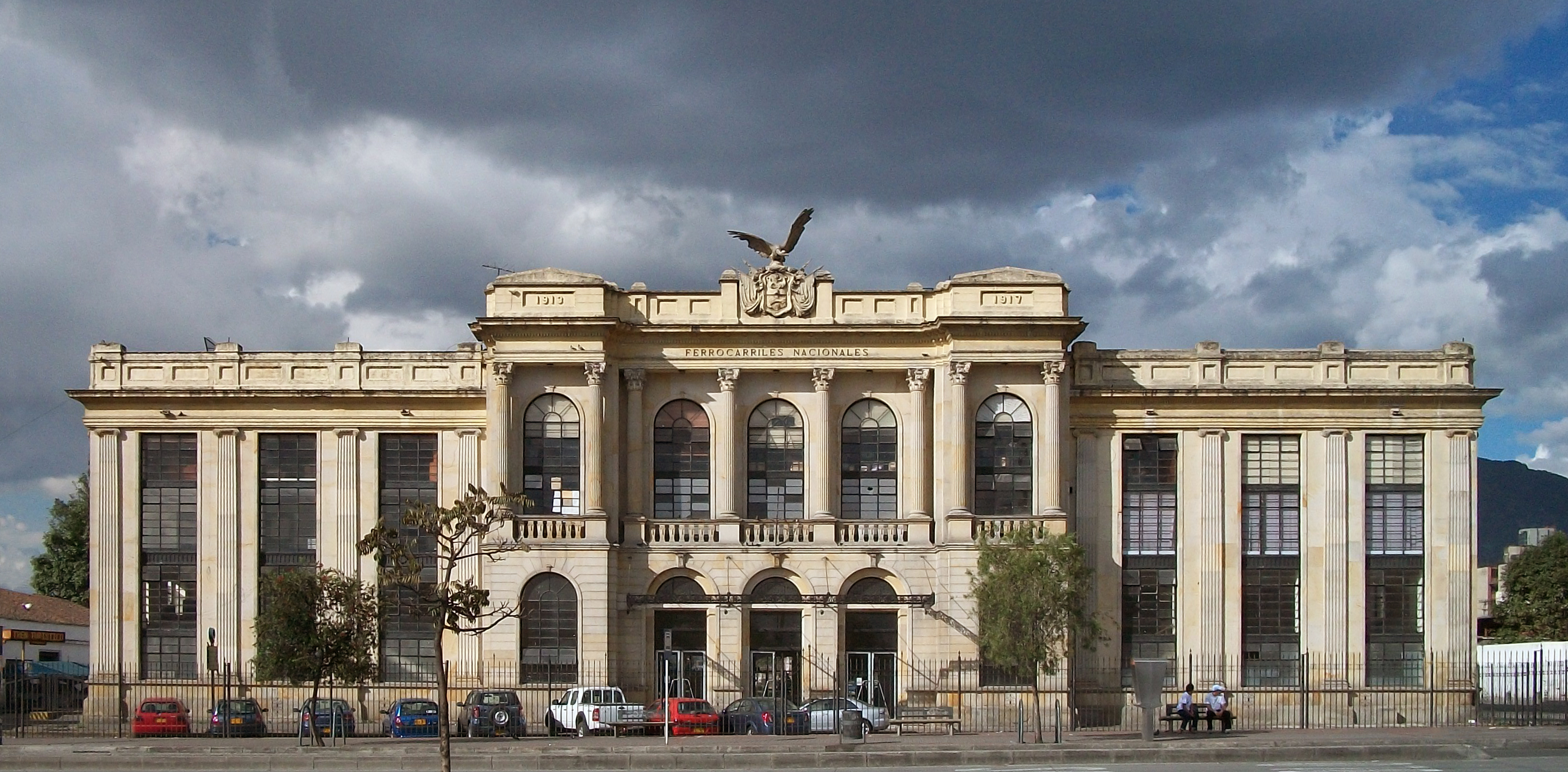
Bogotá La Sabana railway station

Political unease over the Spanish monarchy and the rights of citizens born in the Americas had been felt throughout the Spanish colonies in America, and it was expressed in New Granada in many different ways, accelerating the movement to independence. One of the most transcendent was the Insurrection of the Comuneros, a riot by the locals that started in Villa del Socorro —current Department of Santander—in March 1781. Spanish authorities suppressed the riot, and José Antonio Galán, the leader, was executed. He left an imprint, though. One of the soldiers witnessing his execution was an intellectually curious, noble teenager named Antonio Nariño, who was deeply impressed by both the insurrection and the execution. Nariño went on to become a politician in Santafé, and he became acquainted with the liberal ideas in vogue in Europe. He started organizing clandestine meetings with other intellectuals and politicians to discuss and promote the independence of the American colonies from the Spanish crown. In 1794, Nariño clandestinely translated and published in Santa Fe the Declaration of the Rights of Men and of the Citizen, and copies of his translation were distributed all over the continent and started creating a stirring in the political mentalities of the time. The Spanish government had banned the distribution of the pamphlet and soon discovered the material and burned any copy that they could find. Nariño was arrested on 29 August 1794, and sentenced to ten years of imprisonment and to have all of his properties confiscated, and was sent to exile the year after. Those suspected of being part of Nariño's intellectual circle were also persecuted, but his ideas had become widespread.

In 1807, following the French invasion of Spain and the subsequent abdication of the House of Bourbon in Spain, pressed by Napoleon to give the crown to his brother Joseph, resulting in the destruction of the Spanish administration, many in Spain and in the American colonies created local resistance governments called Juntas. The dissolution of the Supreme Central Junta, following a series of military defeats in the Spanish troops, promoted the creation of local juntas all throughout Latin America, which very soon consolidated the independentist ideas already in vogue. After the establishment of a junta in Cartagena de Indias on 22 May 1810, and in many other cities throughout the Viceroyalty, the Junta de Santa Fe was established on 20 July 1810, in what is often called the Colombian Declaration of Independence. The Junta adopted the name of "Supreme Junta of the New Kingdom of Granada", and first swore allegiance to Viceroy Antonio José Amar y Borbón, and appointed him as president, but then he was deposed and arrested five days later. After declaring independence from Spain the different juntas attempted to establish a congress of provinces, but they were unable to do so and military conflicts soon emerged.

The period between 1810 and 1816 was marked by intense conflict between federalist and centralist factions over the nature of the new government of the recently emancipated juntas, a period that has become known as la Patria Boba. The Province of Santafé became the Free and Independent State of Cundinamarca, which soon became embroiled in a civil war against other local juntas which banded together to form the United Provinces of New Granada and advocated for a federalist government system. Following a failed military campaign against Quito, General Simón Bolívar of the United Provinces led a campaign that led to the surrender of the Cundinamarca province in December 1814.

In Spain, the war had ended and the Spanish monarchy was restored on 11 December 1813. King Ferdinand VII declared the uprisings in the colonies illegal and sent a large army to quell the rebellions and reconquer the lost colonies, for which he appointed General Pablo Morillo. Morillo led a successful military campaign that culminated in the capture of Santafé on 6 May 1816.

In 1819, Bolívar initiated his campaign to liberate New Granada. Following a series of battles, the last of which was the Battle of Boyacá, the republican army led by Bolívar cleared its way to Santafé, where he arrived victorious on 10 August 1819. It was Simón Bolívar who rebaptized the city with the name of Bogotá, to honor the Muisca people and to emphasize the emancipation from Spain. Bogotá then became the capital of the Gran Colombia.

Between 1819 and 1849, there were no fundamental structural changes from the colonial period. By the mid-19th century, a series of fundamental reforms were enacted, some of the most important being slavery abolition and religious, teaching, print and speech industry and trade freedom, among others. During the decade of the 70s, radicalism accelerated reforms and state and social institutions were substantially modified. However, during the second half of the century, the country faced permanent pronouncements, declarations of rebellions between states, and factions which resulted in civil wars: the last and bloodiest was the Thousand Days' War from 1899 to 1902.

In 1823, a few years after the formation of Gran Colombia, the Public Library, now the National Library, was enlarged and modernized with new volumes and better facilities. The National Museum was founded. Those institutions were of great importance to the new republic's cultural development. The Central University was the first State school, precursor of the current National University, founded in 1867 and domiciled in Bogotá.

=== Regeneration ===
President Rafael Núñez declared the end of Federalism, and in 1886 the country became a centralist republic ruled by the constitution in force – save some amendments – up to 1991. In the middle of political and administration avatars, Bogotá continued as the capital and principal political center of the country.

From a base of only 20,000 people in 1793, the city grew to approximately 117,000 people in 1912. Population growth was rapid after 1870, largely because of emigration from the eastern highlands.

=== Twentieth century ===
Early in the 20th century, Colombia had to face devastating consequences from the Thousand Days' War, which lasted from 1899 to 1902, and the loss of Panama. Between 1904 and 1909, the lawfulness of the liberal party was re-established and President Rafael Reyes endeavored to implement a national government. Peace and state reorganization generated the increase of economic activities. Bogotá started deep architectural and urban transformation with significant industrial and artisan production increases. In 1910, the Industrial Exposition of the Century took place at Park of Independence. Stands built evidenced industrial, artisan work, beaux arts, electricity and machinery progress achieved. The period from 1910 to 1930 is designated conservative hegemony. Between 1924 and 1928, hard union struggles began, with oil fields and banana zone workers' strikes, leaving numerous people dead.

Bogotá had practically no industry. Production was basically artisan work grouped in specific places, similar to commercial sectors. Plaza de Bolívar and surroundings lodged hat stores, at Calle del Comercio –current Carrera Seventh– and Calle Florián –now Carrera Eight– luxurious stores selling imported products opened their doors; at Pasaje Hernández, tailor's shops provided their services, and between 1870 and 1883, four main banks opened their doors: Bogotá, Colombia, Popular and Mortgage Credit banks.

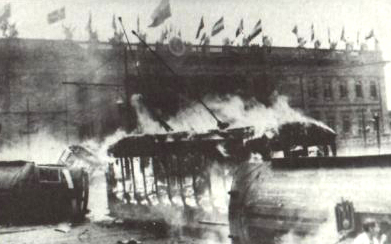
Bogotazo in 1948

Following the 1928 Banana Massacre of fruit pickers and conservative party division, Enrique Olaya Herrera took office in 1930. The liberal party reformed during 16 years of the so-called Liberal Republic, agricultural, social, political, labor, educational, economic and administrative sectors. Unionism strengthened and education coverage expanded.

The celebration produced a large number of infrastructure works, new construction and work sources. In 1948 liberal leader Jorge Eliécer Gaitán was assassinated, and subsequent riots in an event called El Bogotazo resulted in Bogotá's downtown being virtually destroyed. From then, Bogotá's urban, architectural and population sectors were substantially reorganized. The violence sparked civil conflict, La Violencia, that lasted ten years.

=== Twenty-first century ===
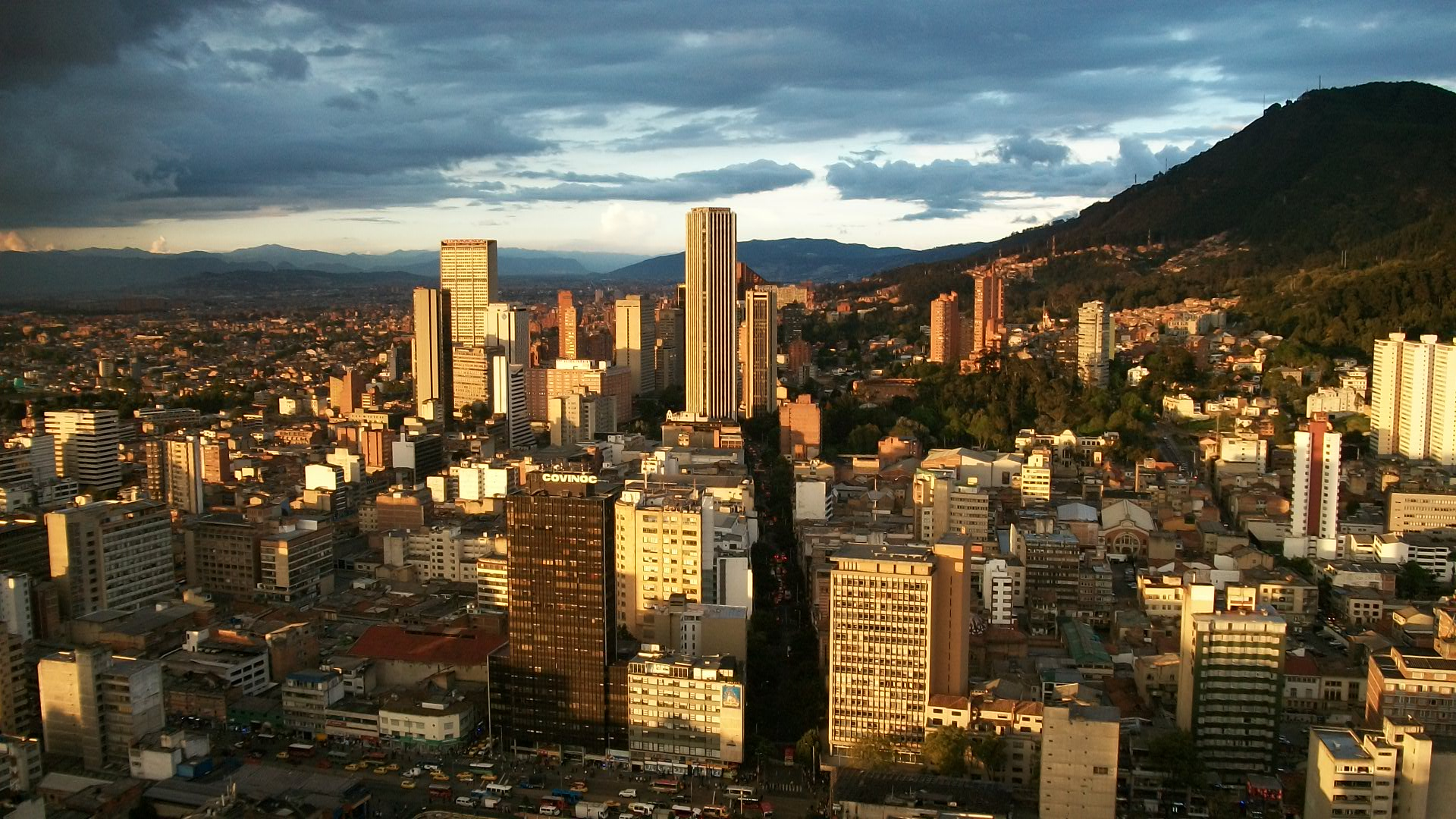
Bogotá is the second largest city within city limits in South America by population, after São Paulo.

The city began the 21st century with important changes in its urban space and public transport, looking to plan demographic and economic growth, that would position it as a strategic hub for international business in Latin America. Some of the main interventions initiated looked to develop projects contained in the Plan of Territorial Ordering (POT), which aims to guide the development of the city for the next two centuries.

One of the most important interventions in the city was in its transportation system. In 1967, there were 2,679 urban buses in Bogotá that transported, on average, 1,630,000 passengers per day. The city had about 1 million inhabitants and 80 km^{2} of area, the service was relatively reasonable. But as the city grew and reached more than five million and an area greater than 300 km^{2}, not only did the car fleet increase substantially to more than 20,000 vehicles, but traffic complexity increased, as well as pollution and the inefficiency of the only existing transportation system.

By the end of the 20th century, the situation was difficult. There was no real urban public transport system that would serve as an alternative to the private vehicle – which further incentivized its use – and the city had low levels of competitiveness in Latin America, as well as an unsatisfactory quality of life for the vast majority of its inhabitants. The administrations of mayors Andrés Pastrana (1988–90) and Jaime Castro (1992–94), in addition to the first of Antanas Mockus (1995–97), formulated proposals to solve the problem of public transport, with limited results. It was during the mayoralty of the latter when there was talk about the possibility of establishing a mass transportation system that would help remedy the problem of mobility.

Under the second administration of Antanas Mockus, Bogotá opened a 'zone of tolerancia' which legalized prostitution in a large swath of the center of the city in the Santa Fe neighborhood.

Mayor Enrique Peñalosa (whose first term was 1998–2000) included in his program as a priority a solution to public transport. Consequently, in the execution of the development plan "For the Bogotá we Want" in terms of mobility and in a mass transportation system project, the construction of special infrastructure exclusively for its operation was determined. This system would include specialized bus corridors, equipped with single-use lanes, stations, bridges, bike paths and special pedestrian access platforms, designed to facilitate the user's experience in the system. However, Peñalosa became infamous for his campaign against the poor, saying he would rather see robbers on the streets, than people selling candies. Peñalosa served a second term (2016–19).

After being elected in 2011, Mayor Gustavo Petro clashed with the conservative political establishment after remunicipalization of the city's garbage collection system. The inspector general Alejandro Ordoñez deposed Petro for alleged constitutional overreach when he tried to replace the city's private trash collectors. Petro was reinstated weeks later after a Bogotá court ruled that Ordoñez had overstepped his authority.

The TransMilenio system of articulated buses opened its first phase in 2000 and has since grown to 12 lines. As the city's population increased, the buses are often crowded, leading to the development of Bogotá Metro, construction on which began in 2021.

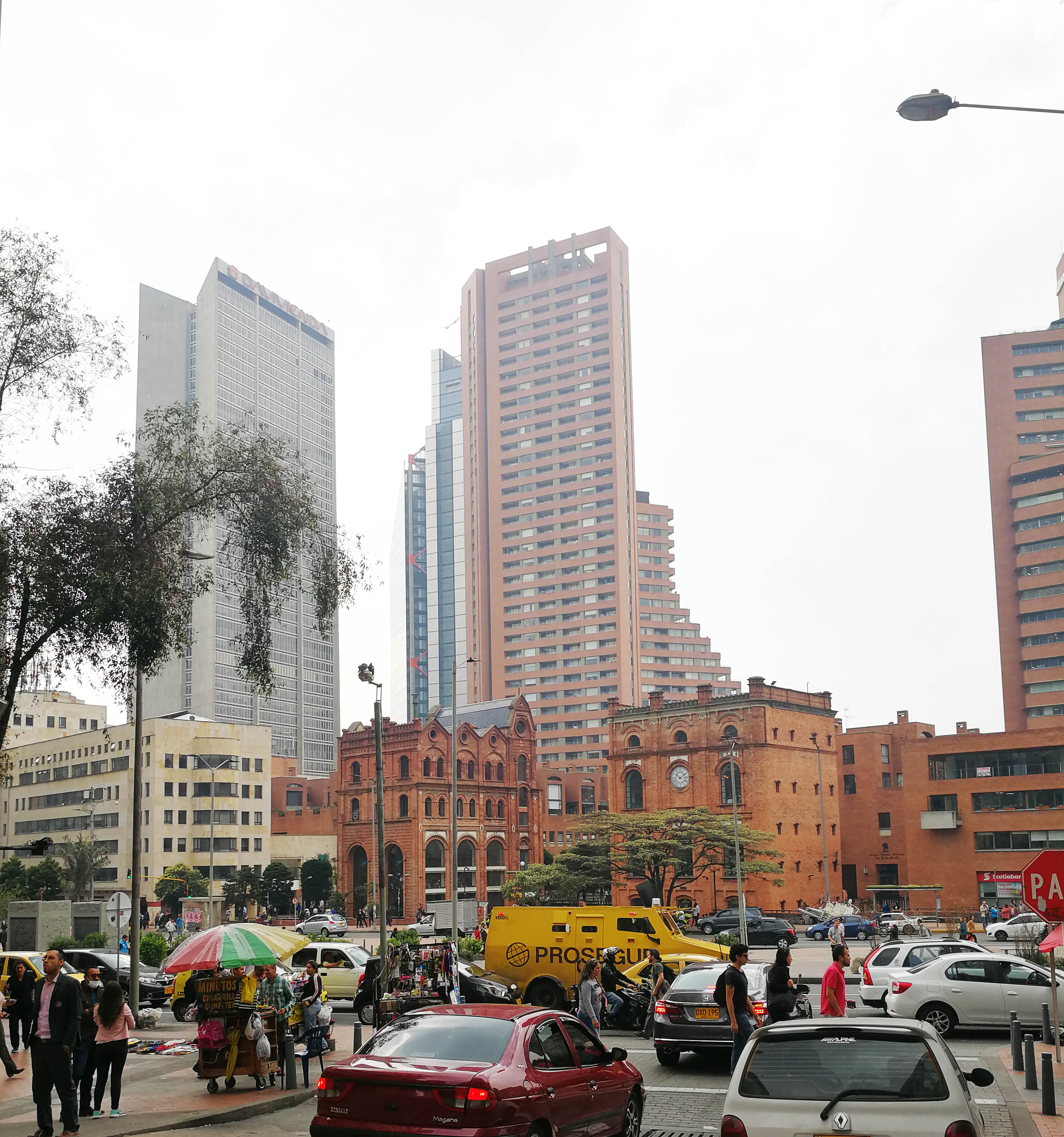
Financial District

For its part, the cultural equipment plan of Bogotá has yielded significant results, including the construction of three large public libraries in different sectors. These libraries have not only expanded access to existing library resources but also serve as some of the 150 hubs for BibloRed - Bogotá's Public Libraries Network, including the Bogota Digital Library The new libraries were located in sectors that allow a wide coverage, have easy access by public transport and bike paths; and their projects were commissioned to distinguished architects of the city. They are those of El Tunal, in the south, projected by the architect Suely Vargas; of El Tintal, in the west, the work of the architect Daniel Bermúdez; and the Virgilio Barco Vargas library, located in the Simón Bolívar park in the central area, work of the architect Rogelio Salmona. Out of the city's 150 libraries, these three, with their outstanding architecture, provide public and open-access spaces for the educational and cultural development of the citizens of Bogotá.

As for 2019, the city's distribution is composed of nine main business centers (Av. El Dorado Business Corridor, Centro Internacional, Parque de la 93, El Lago, North Point, Calle 100, Santa Barbara Business Center, Zona Industrial Montevideo & Parque Industrial Zona Franca). Grittier sides sit south and southwest, where working-class barrios continue to battle their reputations for drugs and crime. In the ritzier north there are boutique hotels, corporate offices and well-heeled locals piling into chic entertainment districts such as the Zona Rosa and Zona G.

Protests against police brutality started in Bogotá following the death of Javier Ordóñez while in police custody on 9 September 2020. The National Police killed 13 people and injured over 400 in their response to the protests.

== Geography ==
Bogotá from space

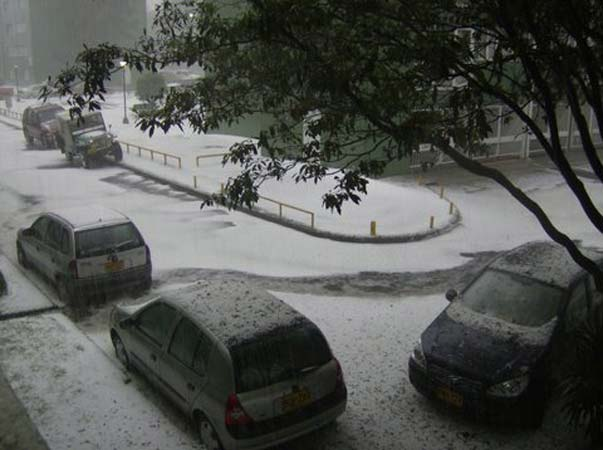
Hailstorm in Bogotá

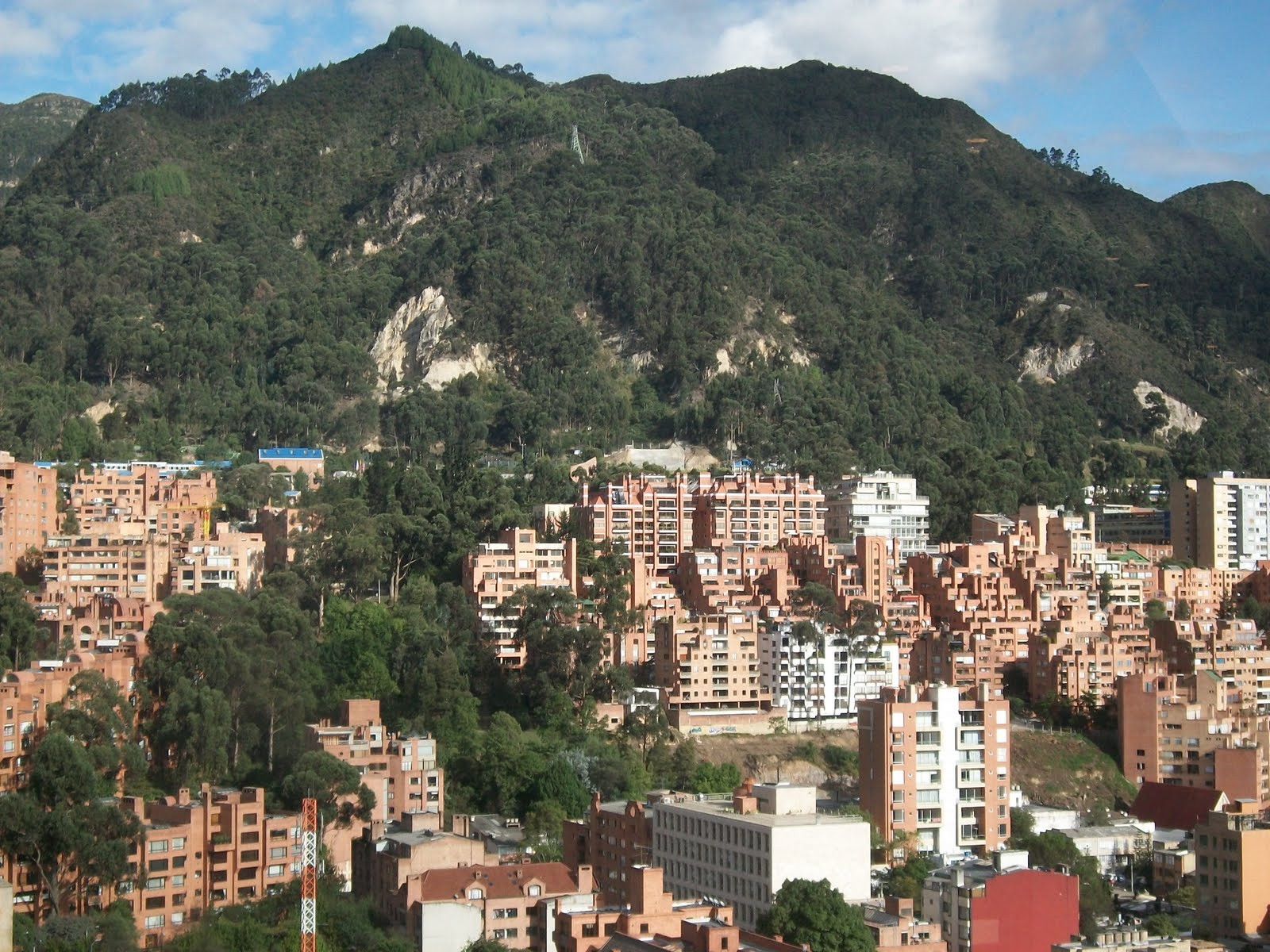
Eastern Hills

Bogotá is located in the southeastern part of the Bogotá savanna (Sabana de Bogotá) at an average altitude of 2,640 meters (8,660 ft) above sea level. The Bogotá savanna is popularly called "savannah" (sabana), but constitutes actually a high plateau in the Andes mountains, part of an extended region known as the Altiplano Cundiboyacense, which literally means "high plateau of Cundinamarca and Boyacá". Bogotá is the largest city in the world at its elevation; there is no urban area that is both higher and more populous than Bogotá.

In the extreme south of Bogotá's District, the world's largest continuous paramo ecosystem can be found; Sumapaz Páramo in the locality Sumapaz. The Bogotá River running NE-SW crosses the sabana, forming Tequendama Falls (Salto del Tequendama) to the south. Tributary rivers form valleys with villages, whose economy is based on agriculture, livestock raising and artisanal production.

The sabana is bordered to the east by the Eastern Cordillera of the Andes mountain range. The Eastern Hills, which limit city growth, run from south to north, forming east of the downtown the Guadalupe and Monserrate mountains. The western city limit is Bogotá River. The Sumapaz Paramo (moorland) borders the south and to the north Bogotá extends over the plateau up to the towns of Chía and Sopó.

Most of the wetlands in the Bogotá region have disappeared. They covered nearly 50,000 hectares in the 1960s, compared to only 727 in 2019, for a disappearance rate of 98%.

=== Climate ===
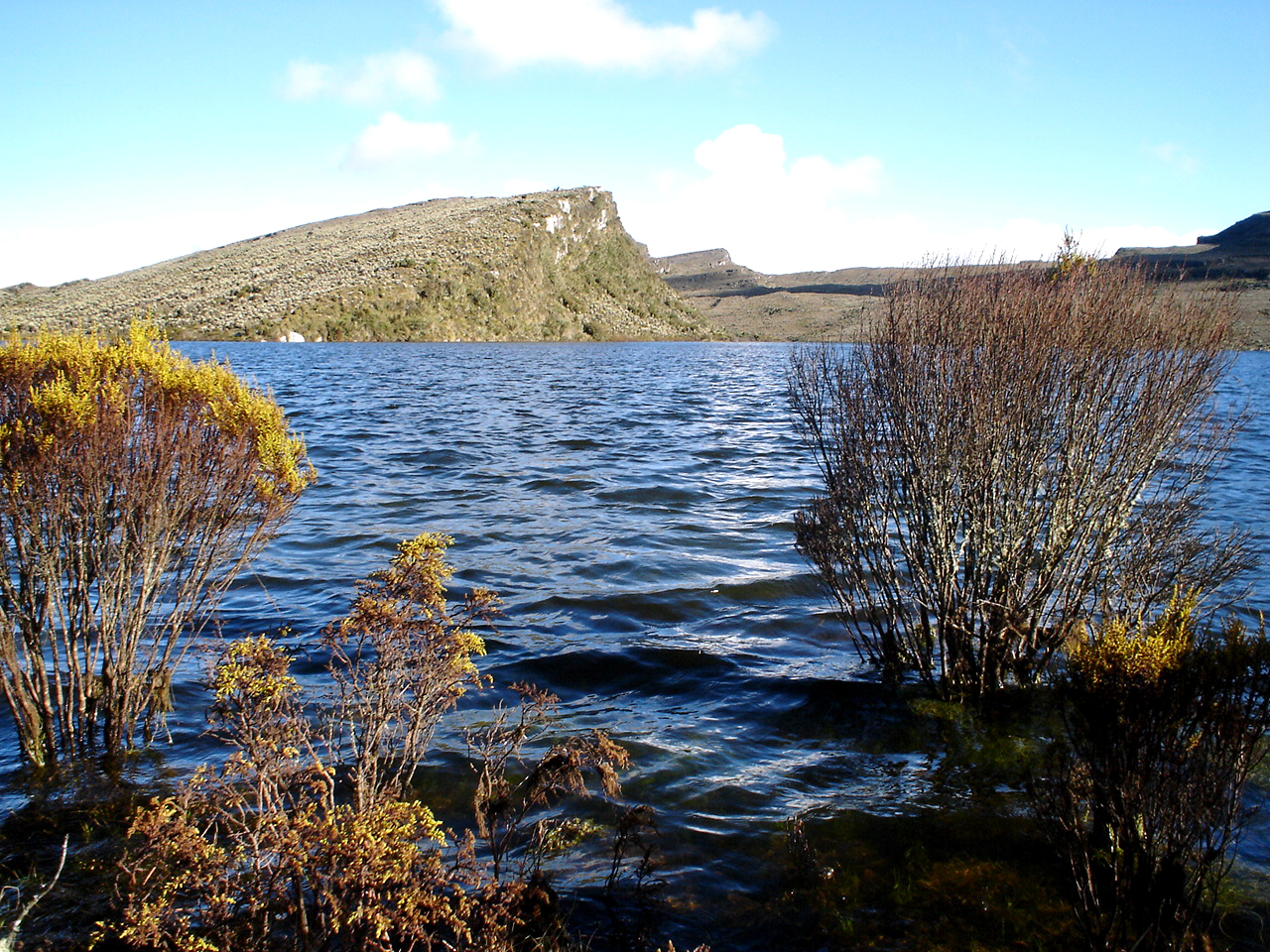
Sumapaz Páramo

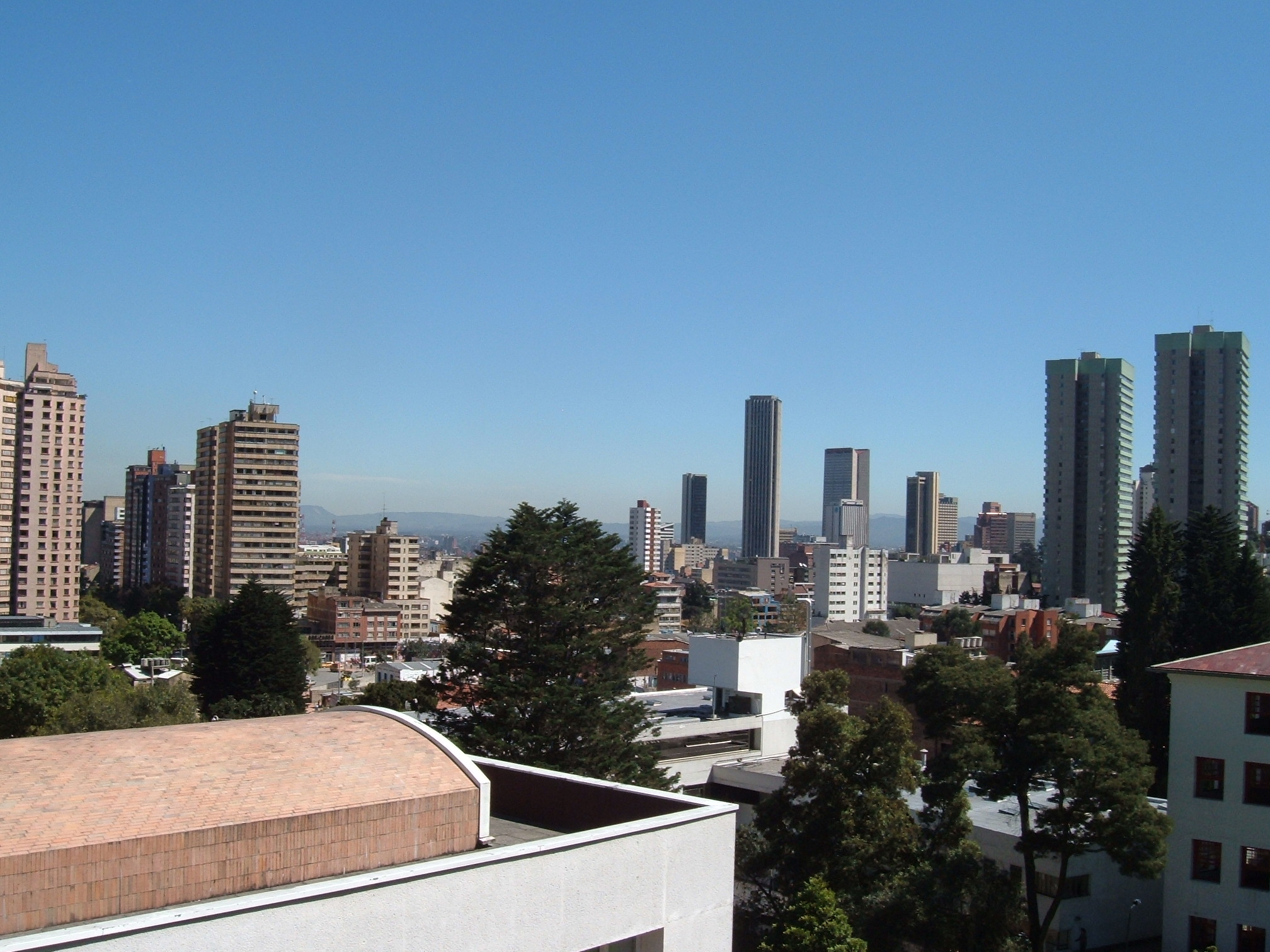
The city of Bogotá on an unusual clear day

Bogotá features a subtropical highland climate with uniform precipitation (Köppen: Cfb, Trewartha: Cfll). The average temperature is 14.5 °C (58 °F), varying from 6 to 19 °C (43 to 66 °F) on sunny days to 10 to 18 °C (50 to 64 °F) on rainy days. Dry and rainy seasons alternate throughout the year. The driest months are December, January, July and August. The warmest month is March, bringing a maximum of 19.7 °C (67.5 °F). The coolest nights occur in January, with an average of 7.6 °C (45.7 °F) in the city; fog is very usual in early morning, 220 days per year, whilst clear sky sunny full days are quite unusual.

Hailstorms occur sporadically, averaging three times per year—between 1939 and 2008, 231 events were recorded. They occur in the afternoon during the rainy season, when cumulonimbus cloud cells develop rapidly. They also cause a noticeable drop in temperature in the affected areas, sometimes drastic, reaching almost 20 degrees in less than an hour.

The official highest temperature recorded within the city limits is 30.0 °C (86 °F), and the lowest temperature recorded is −7.1 °C (19 °F), both at the Guaymaral Airport.

The rainiest months are April, May, September, October, and November, in which typical days are mostly overcast, with low clouds and some winds, bringing maximum temperatures of 18 °C (64 °F) and lows of 7 °C (45 °F).

On 30 October 2012, the first snowfall in more than 150 years was recorded in the administrative area of Bogotá, specifically in Sumapaz, followed by further significant snowfalls in 2016, 2017, 2020 and 2022.

On 8 February 2017, Bogotá recorded a temperature of 25.1 °C, the highest in the city in sixty years, according to the Institute of Hydrology, Meteorology and Environmental Studies (IDEAM). In February 2020, Bogotá recorded a temperature of −6.3 °C, one of the lowest in the city in recent years, according to the IDEAM.

Climate data for Bogotá (El Dorado International Airport), elevation 2,547 m (8,356 ft), (1991–2020)
Month	Jan	Feb	Mar	Apr	May	Jun	Jul	Aug	Sep	Oct	Nov	Dec	Year
Record high °C (°F)	26.4 (79.5)	25.2 (77.4)	26.6 (79.9)	24.4 (75.9)	25.0 (77.0)	28.6 (83.5)	25.0 (77.0)	23.6 (74.5)	26.0 (78.8)	25.1 (77.2)	25.6 (78.1)	24.4 (75.9)	28.6 (83.5)
Mean daily maximum °C (°F)	20.1 (68.2)	20.2 (68.4)	19.8 (67.6)	19.5 (67.1)	19.4 (66.9)	18.9 (66.0)	18.5 (65.3)	18.8 (65.8)	19.2 (66.6)	19.4 (66.9)	19.4 (66.9)	19.8 (67.6)	19.4 (66.9)
Daily mean °C (°F)	13.6 (56.5)	14.0 (57.2)	14.1 (57.4)	14.3 (57.7)	14.3 (57.7)	14.2 (57.6)	13.8 (56.8)	13.8 (56.8)	13.8 (56.8)	13.7 (56.7)	13.8 (56.8)	13.7 (56.7)	13.9 (57.0)
Mean daily minimum °C (°F)	6.4 (43.5)	7.6 (45.7)	8.6 (47.5)	9.6 (49.3)	9.6 (49.3)	9.1 (48.4)	8.6 (47.5)	8.4 (47.1)	7.8 (46.0)	8.3 (46.9)	8.6 (47.5)	7.5 (45.5)	8.3 (46.9)
Record low °C (°F)	−3.0 (26.6)	−5.2 (22.6)	−3.2 (26.2)	0.0 (32.0)	0.2 (32.4)	1.0 (33.8)	0.4 (32.7)	−1.5 (29.3)	−0.2 (31.6)	0.8 (33.4)	−3.0 (26.6)	−6.0 (21.2)	−6.0 (21.2)
Average precipitation mm (inches)	32.9 (1.30)	51.4 (2.02)	83.4 (3.28)	116.7 (4.59)	109.0 (4.29)	57.4 (2.26)	48.6 (1.91)	44.3 (1.74)	56.7 (2.23)	108.2 (4.26)	107.2 (4.22)	61.4 (2.42)	877.3 (34.54)
Average precipitation days (≥ 1 mm)	4.9	7.4	10.9	13.4	13.5	10.2	9.5	9.1	9.0	12.1	12.1	7.7	119.9
Average relative humidity (%)	79	79	81	82	82	79	78	77	79	83	83	81	80
Mean monthly sunshine hours	182.9	149.6	136.4	105.0	108.5	117.0	133.3	136.4	123.0	117.8	126.0	158.1	1,594
Mean daily sunshine hours	5.9	5.3	4.4	3.5	3.5	3.9	4.3	4.4	4.1	3.8	4.2	5.1	4.4
Source 1: Instituto de Hidrologia Meteorologia y Estudios Ambientales (humidity, sun 1981-2010)
Source 2: NOAA (extremes)

Climate data for Bogotá (National Meteorological Observatory), elevation 2,556 m (8,386 ft), (1971–2000)
Month	Jan	Feb	Mar	Apr	May	Jun	Jul	Aug	Sep	Oct	Nov	Dec	Year
Mean daily maximum °C (°F)	20.2 (68.4)	20.3 (68.5)	20.4 (68.7)	20.1 (68.2)	20.0 (68.0)	19.2 (66.6)	18.6 (65.5)	18.8 (65.8)	19.2 (66.6)	19.5 (67.1)	19.6 (67.3)	19.9 (67.8)	19.6 (67.3)
Daily mean °C (°F)	14.3 (57.7)	14.5 (58.1)	14.9 (58.8)	14.9 (58.8)	15.0 (59.0)	14.6 (58.3)	14.1 (57.4)	14.3 (57.7)	14.3 (57.7)	14.4 (57.9)	14.6 (58.3)	14.4 (57.9)	14.5 (58.1)
Mean daily minimum °C (°F)	7.6 (45.7)	8.4 (47.1)	9.5 (49.1)	9.7 (49.5)	9.7 (49.5)	9.5 (49.1)	9.2 (48.6)	8.9 (48.0)	8.7 (47.7)	9.0 (48.2)	9.2 (48.6)	8.0 (46.4)	9.0 (48.2)
Average precipitation mm (inches)	49.5 (1.95)	67.7 (2.67)	90.6 (3.57)	135.2 (5.32)	119.8 (4.72)	54.0 (2.13)	35.2 (1.39)	44.7 (1.76)	70.1 (2.76)	137.4 (5.41)	127.1 (5.00)	80.7 (3.18)	1,012 (39.8)
Average precipitation days	9	12	14	18	19	17	15	14	16	21	16	11	181
Average relative humidity (%)	75	76	75	77	77	75	74	74	75	76	77	76	76
Mean monthly sunshine hours	155.0	124.4	105.4	81.0	83.7	93.0	114.7	117.8	108.0	96.1	102.0	139.5	1,320.6
Mean daily sunshine hours	5.0	4.4	3.4	2.7	2.7	3.1	3.7	3.8	3.6	3.1	3.4	4.5	3.6
Source 1: Instituto de Hidrologia Meteorologia y Estudios Ambientales
Source 2: Instituto de Hidrologia Meteorologia y Estudios Ambientales

=== Urban layout and nomenclature ===
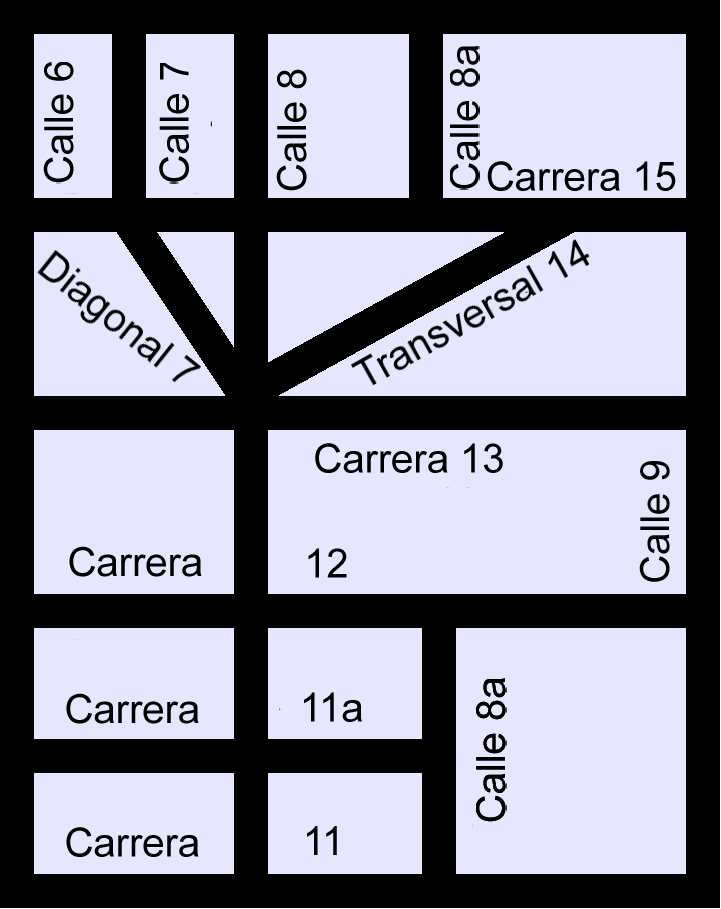
Street arrangement of Bogotá based on the Cartesian coordinate system: North is to the right. (Typical maps for the city place the north on the left.)

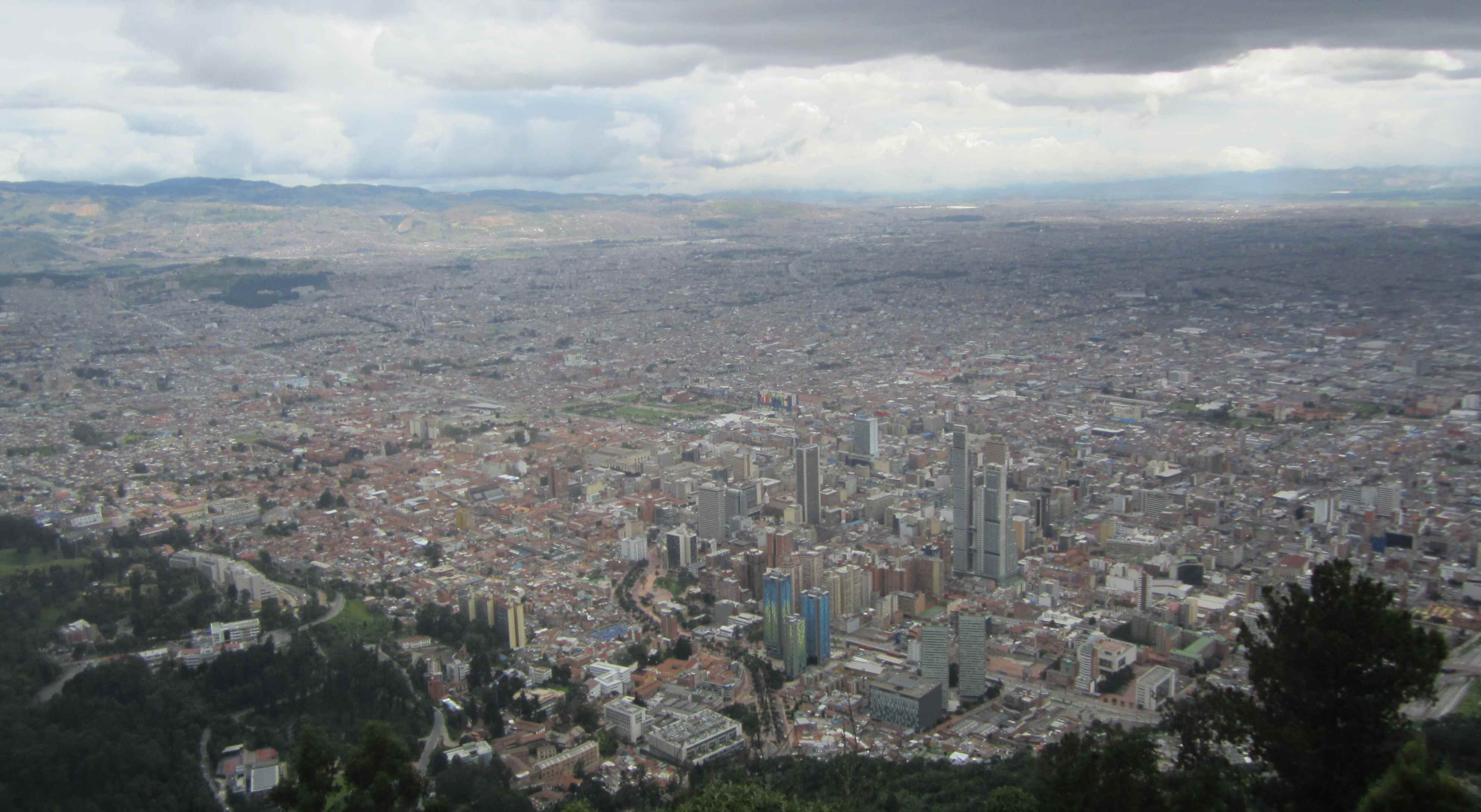
View of Bogotá from the mountain Monserrate

The colonial city, from 1539 to 1810, barely changed its urban layout and culture. Santafe was slowly leaving behind the colonialism after the independence revolution from 1810 to 1819. Entering the 19th century, the city of Bogotá was still the political and demographic core of Nueva Granada but remained a small city as compared with similar cities, such as Lima and Buenos Aires. At the year of 1801, the city had 173 blocks and 21,394 inhabitants marking a slow population growth during the 18th century. In the beginning of the 19th century, city life was marked by the lack of cultural activity and public services as well as by the excessive Catholic religiosity in its inhabitants, which almost controlled the whole life of people, as a journalist traveler wrote in 1822 (Biblioteca Luis Angel Arango, 1990,2 ).

The city's urban shape remained the same in the 19th century as the 1557 urban landscape as a checkerboard with the Plaza as its core. In other words, the city grew in area adding new square blocks but kept the same urban fabric. Buildings were low rise, as a traveler wrote in 1830 (Bibliotheca Luis Angel Arango, 1990,2), where most city buildings had one floor, and a few had no more than two. One special characteristic of those houses with two floors, which were the houses of the wealthiest families of Bogotá, were their balconies. The building facades of Bogotá were very simplistic without ornaments, meaning no more than a wall with windows and the entry door. However, due to the poor street conditions because of the potholes and waste, in addition to the lack of cultural and social activity at night, the ornaments were reserved to indoors where Bogotanos spent most of their time. One of the few outdoor activities of the people of Bogotá during the first half of the 19th century was going to the Plaza or the "altozano" as the locals called it. The Plaza was the social core of the city, where fresh fruits were sold and where inhabitants from all socioeconomic backgrounds converged (Bibliotheca Luis Angel Arango, 1990,2).

The landscape of Bogotá was very similar from the 16th century to 19th century. Nonetheless, after the milestone fact of the independence from the Spanish, which was a process that lasted at least ten years from 1810 to 1819, some changes started to happen. Those changes were happening slowly while the new republican order was getting power. Trying to make a difference from the colonial ages, the new Republic began changing the name of the plazas, streets and even the name of the city, from Santafe to Bogotá. The names of colonial streets were changed to numbers and the name of plazas were changed to the founding fathers of Colombia. Thereafter, the empty plazas of the colonial ages turned into ornamented plazas with plenty of trees and civic statues. For instance, the first civil statue placed in a plaza in Colombia was the figure of Bolivar, the main founding father of Colombia. The statue of Bolivar was unveiled on 20 July 1846, which is the Independence Day of Colombia, trying to strengthen the patriotism of the new republic in people of Bogotá and Colombia.

The last quarter of the 19th century, from 1870 to 1900, more clearly marked a new urban landscape of Bogotá. The constant rural migration to Bogotá had been one of the most important factors that allowed the city to maintain its influential power in the region both during the colonial ages and during the republic. In 1847, the city governor and the council tried to expand the urban area of Bogotá beyond the colonial limits, whereas, only until the 1860s was that expansion encouraged by the president of Colombia Tomas Cipriano de Mosquera. The Mosquera plan included lotting the western part of Bogotá, building bridges and wider roads and plazas, but that plan was only partially implemented. In the following decade, other urban initiatives emerged but this time from the private sector. A group of businessmen, tired of the city's slow growth and development, proposed the construction of sewers, theaters, electric systems and new roads in order to hasten the development of Bogotá. Because of the 1876 civil war, the plan could not be implemented, but from that initiative, the council adopted the first urban code of Bogotá in 1875. These initiatives tried to update the undeveloped city to the new technologies of the 1800s; however, the pace remained slow, and only after 1882, when the train and the trolley came to Bogotá, some urban development projects progressed more quickly.

Today Bogotá has 20 localities, or districts, forming an extensive network of neighborhoods. Areas of higher economic status tend to be located in the north, close to the Eastern Hills in the districts of Chapinero, Usaquén and the east of Suba. The lower middle class inhabit the central, western and northwestern parts of the city.. The working-class neighborhoods are located in the south, some of them squatter areas.

Bogotá, Distrito Capital shown in red on a map of districts of Colombia.

The urban layout in the center of the city is based on the focal point of a square or plaza, typical of Spanish-founded settlements, but the layout gradually becomes more modern in outlying neighborhoods. The types of roads are classified as Calles (streets), which run from west to east horizontally, with street numbers increasing towards the north, and also towards the south (with the suffix "Sur") from Calle 0 down south. Carreras (roads) run from north to south vertically, with numbering increasing from east to west. (with the suffix "Este" for roads east of Carrera 0). At the southeast of the city, the addresses are logically sur-este. Other types of roads more common in newer parts of the city may be termed Eje (Axis), Diagonal or Transversal. The numbering system for street addresses recently changed, and numbers are assigned according to street rank from main avenues to smaller avenues and local streets. Some of Bogotá's main roads, which also go by a proper name in addition to a number, are:

- Norte-Quito-Sur or NQS (North Quito South Avenue, from 9th Rd at north following railway to 30th Rd, or Quito City Avenue, and Southern Highway)
- Autopista Norte-Avenida Caracas (Northern Highway, or 45th Rd, joined to Caracas Avenue, or 14th Rd)
- Avenida Circunvalar (or 1st Rd)
- Avenida Suba (60th transversal from 100th St the Suba Hills; 145th St from Suba Hills westward)
- Avenida El Dorado (El Dorado Avenue, or 26th St)
- Avenida de las Américas (Avenue of the Americas, from 34th street at east to 6th street at west)
- Avenida Primero de Mayo (May First Avenue, or 22nd St South)
- Avenida Ciudad de Cali (Cali City Avenue, or 86th Rd)
- Avenida Boyacá (Boyacá Avenue, or 72nd Rd)
- Autopista Sur (Southern Highway)

== Demographics ==
Historical population
Year	Pop.	±%
1500	160,000	—
1775	16,233	−89.9%
1800	21,964	+35.3%
1832	28,341	+29.0%
1870	40,883	+44.3%
1912	121,257	+196.6%
1918	143,994	+18.8%
1928	235,702	+63.7%
1938	325,650	+38.2%
1951	715,250	+119.6%
1964	1,697,311	+137.3%
1973	2,855,065	+68.2%
1985	4,236,490	+48.4%
1993	5,484,244	+29.5%
2005	6,778,691	+23.6%
2018	7,412,566	+9.4%
2020	7,743,955	+4.5%

Population pyramids

2005

2018

2026

The largest and most populous city in Colombia, Bogotá had 7,412,566 inhabitants within the city's limits (2018 census), with a population density of approximately 4,310 inhabitants per square kilometer. 25,166 people are located in rural areas of Capital District. 47.8% of the population are male and 52.2% women.

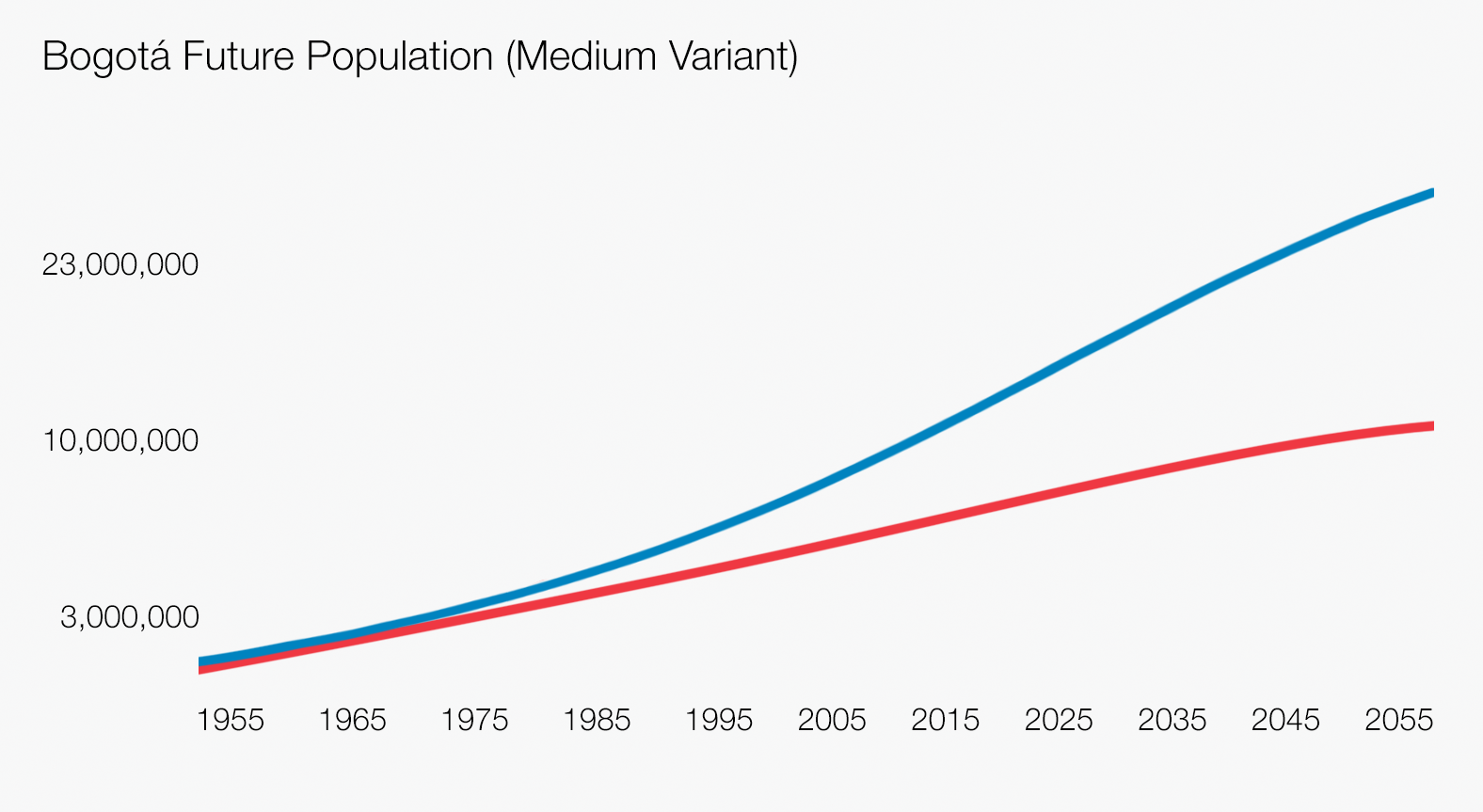
Bogotá future population (medium variant)

In Bogotá, as in the rest of the country, urbanization has accelerated due to industrialization as well as complex political and social reasons such as poverty and violence, which led to migration from rural to urban areas throughout the twentieth and twenty-first centuries. A dramatic example of this is the number of displaced people who have arrived in Bogotá due to the internal armed conflict.

Some estimates show that Bogotá's floating population may be as high as 4 million people, most of them being migrant workers from other departments and displaced people. The majority of the displaced population lives in the Ciudad Bolívar, Kennedy, Usme, and Bosa sections.

Colombia has experienced steady improvements in life expectancy over the past several years, reflecting broader gains in public health, medical access, and socioeconomic development. National data show that life expectancy rose to 78.21 years in 2025, following 78.04 years in 2024. This continued an upward trend from 77.73 years in 2023 and 76.51 years in 2022, the latter representing a notable rebound from pandemic-related mortality increases in 2021.

=== Vital statistics ===
Year	Population	Live births	Deaths	Natural increase	CBR	CDR	Rate of natural increase	TFR	Mother's mean age at childbearing	Ref.
1998	6,014,581	136,458	23,796	112,662	22.7	4.0	18.7	2.55	26.61	
1999	6,134,873	126,067	25,296	100,771	20.6	4.1	16.5	2.31	26.56	
2000	6,252,662	122,863	24,886	97,977	19.7	4.0	15.7	2.22	26.68	
2001	6,367,836	119,352	25,244	94,108	18.7	4.0	14.7	2.12	26.73	
2002	6,478,637	115,245	24,967	90,278	17.8	3.9	13.9	2.02	26.82	
2003	6,586,182	113,901	25,661	88,240	17.3	3.9	13.4	1.97	26.82	
2004	6,684,975	113,678	26,219	87,459	17.0	3.9	13.1	1.94	26.94	
2005	6,710,910	111,888	26,481	85,407	16.7	4.0	12.7	1.89	26.86	
2006	6,801,343	113,296	26,649	86,647	16.7	3.9	12.8	1.89	26.80	
2007	6,884,569	116,638	27,268	89,370	16.9	4.0	12.9	1.92	26.74	
2008	6,960,512	116,765	27,698	89,067	16.8	4.0	12.8	1.91	26.74	
2009	7,031,399	115,659	26,896	88,763	16.5	3.8	12.7	1.86	26.80	
2010	7,096,886	110,032	28,661	81,371	15.5	4.0	11.5	1.75	26.94	
2011	7,152,656	106,228	28,670	77,584	14.9	4.0	10.9	1.67	26.97	
2012	7,195,980	105,314	29,240	76,074	14.6	4.1	10.5	1.65	26.90	
2013	7,228,427	103,237	29,024	74,213	14.3	4.0	10.3	1.61	27.01	
2014	7,252,949	103,842	29,675	74,167	14.3	4.1	10.2	1.61	27.19	
2015	7,273,265	102,795	30,850	71,945	14.1	4.2	9.9	1.59	27.40	
2016	7,300,918	98,653	31,749	66,904	13.5	4.4	9.1	1.53	27.53	
2017	7,337,449	92,054	32,073	59,981	12.5	4.4	8.1	1.42	27.65	
2018	7,412,566	87,191	32,581	54,610	11.8	4.4	7.4	1.33	27.71	
2019	7,592,871	85,075	33,597	51,478	11.2	4.4	6.8	1.27	27.78	
2020	7,732,161	79,322	44,505	34,817	10.3	5.8	4.5	1.17	27.79	
2021	7,823,334	66,988	54,233	12,755	8.6	6.9	1.7	0.98	28.06	
2022	7,873,316	64,765	38,422	26,343	8.2	4.9	3.3	0.95	28.30	
2023	7,907,281	60,912	35,052	25,860	7.7	4.3	3.4	0.89	28.16	
2024	7,929,539	56,541	36,976	19,565	7.1	4.7	2.4	0.8322	28.51	
2025	7,942,867	55,782	38,393	17,389	7.0	4.8	2.2	0.8392	28.59	
2026	7,945,996									

In 2022 13.28% of births were to foreign mothers.

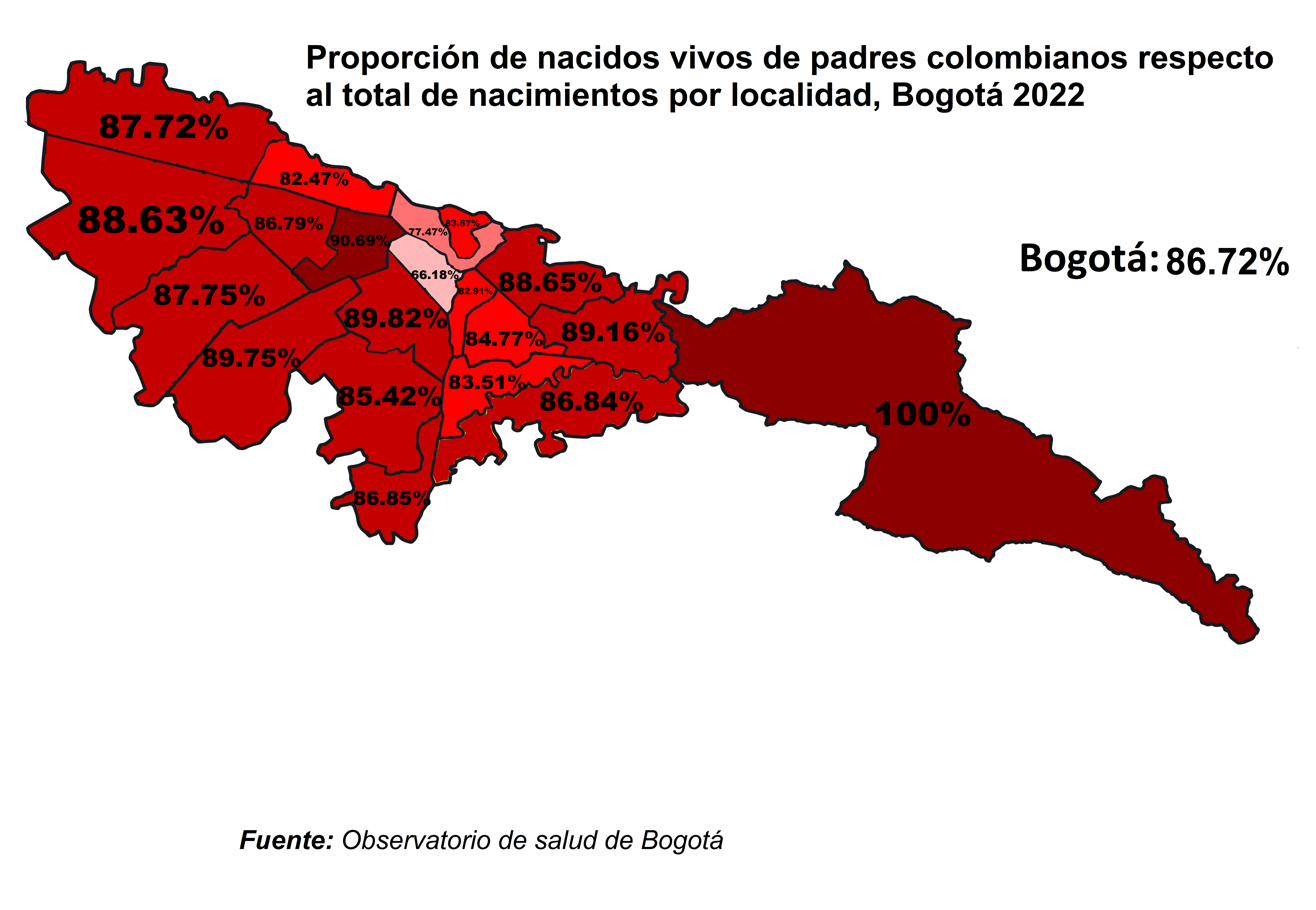
Percentage of live births to Colombian mothers by locality (2022)

Period	Live births	Deaths	Natural increase	Ref.
January–July 2025	31,826	22,229	9,597	
January–July 2026	33,430	22,737	10,693	
Difference	▲+1,604 (+5.04%)	▲+508 (+2.29%)	▲+1,096 (+11.42%)	

=== Total fertility rate (TFR) by locality ===
Locality	TFR (2025pr)	Mother's mean age at childbearing (2024pr)	Ref.
Bogotá	0.82	28.51	
Usaquén	0.77	30.29	
Chapinero	0.78	30.69	
Santa Fe	0.88	26.92	
San Cristóbal	0.77	27.17	
Usme	0.80	27.19	
Tunjuelito	0.84	27.46	
Bosa	0.83	27.29	
Kennedy	0.84	27.86	
Fontibón	0.78	29.70	
Engativá	0.73	28.87	
Suba	0.78	28.96	
Barrios Unidos	0.75	29.04	
Teusaquillo	0.53	30.07	
Los Mártires	1.30	26.47	
Antonio Nariño	1.04	28.47	
Puente Aranda	0.76	29.16	
La Candelaria	0.97	27.94	
Rafael Uribe Uribe	0.90	27.42	
Ciudad Bolívar	0.98	27.04	
Sumapaz	1.13	27.09	

Total Fertility Rate by Locality

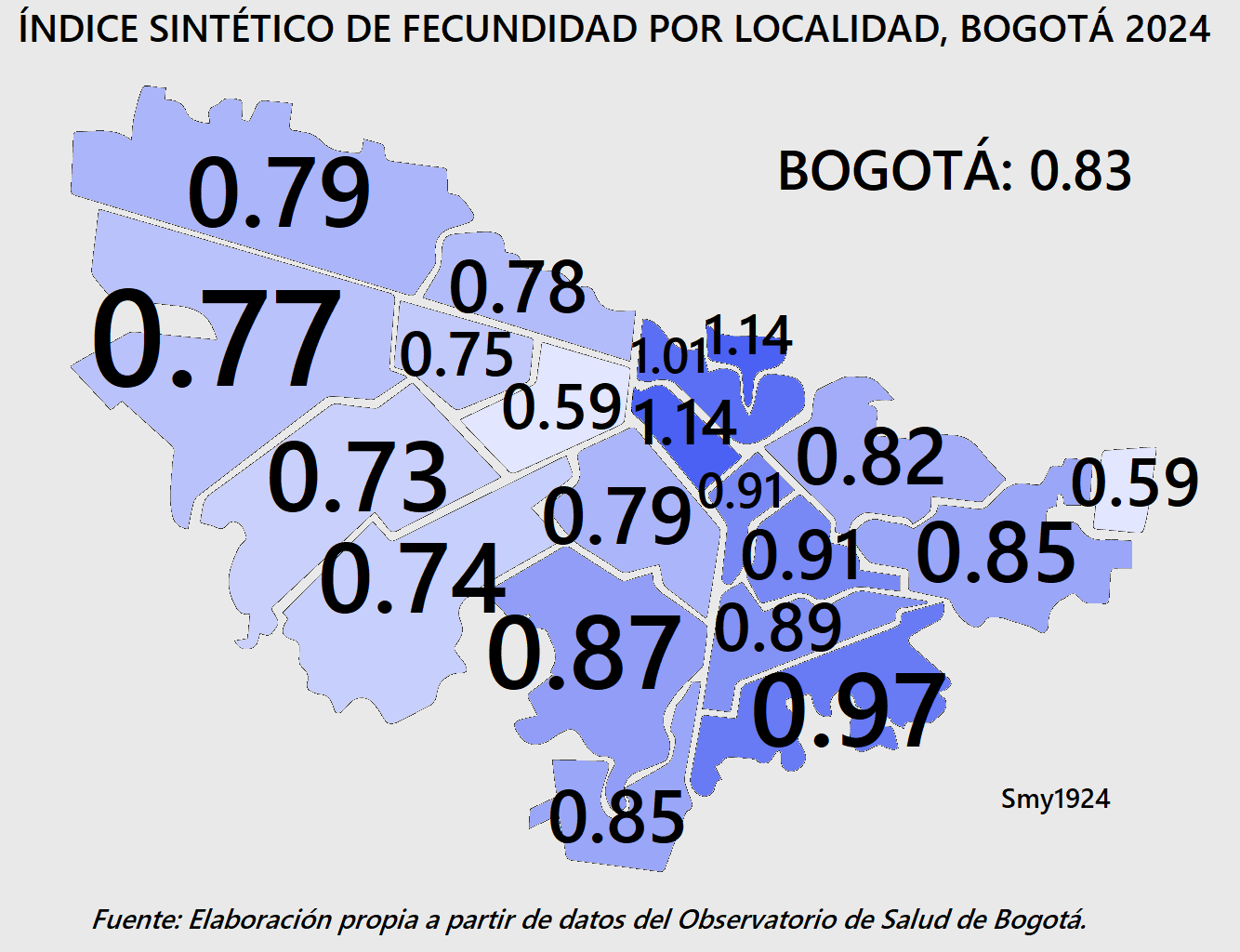
2024.

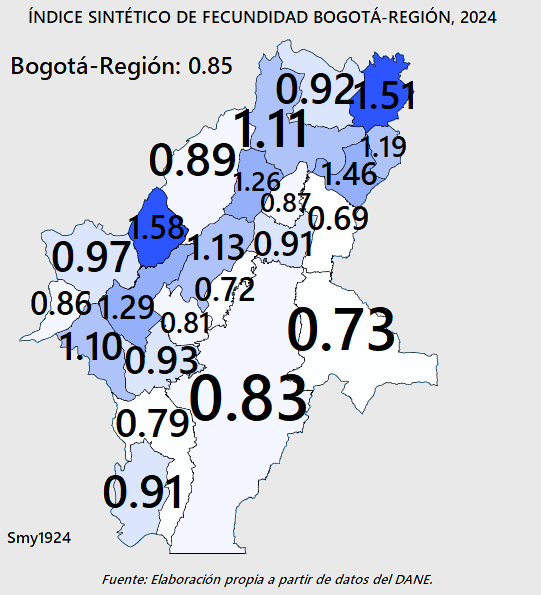
TFR by municipality, Bogotá metropolitan area, 2024.

=== Ethnic groups ===
Race and ethnicity in Bogotá
1. White and Mestizo (98.8%)
2. Afro-Colombian (includes Mixed) (0.90%)
3. Indigenous (0.30%)

According to data from the latest census, conducted in 2018: 0.27% of the city's inhabitants identify as Indigenous; 0.01% as Rrom or Gypsy—the same percentage applies to the Raizal people of the San Andrés, Providencia, and Santa Catalina Archipelago; 218 individuals identified as Palenqueros from San Basilio; 0.91% as Black, Mulatto, Afro-descendant, or Afro-Colombian; and 96.81% did not identify with any of the aforementioned groups. A further 1.99% did not report an ethnic-racial group.

Place of birth

By 2018, 39.8% of the city's population had been born outside the city.

Approximately 40% of the city’s population was born somewhere other than Bogotá—a figure that exceeds 50% among those over 45, and reaches nearly 80% among those over 85; Bogotá is a city primarily composed of internal migrants from within Colombia and their descendants.

In Bogotá, the accelerated urbanization process is not exclusively due to industrialization, as there are complex political and social reasons, such as poverty and violence, which have motivated migration from the countryside to the city throughout the 20th century, determining an exponential growth of the population in Bogotá and the establishment of misery belts in its surroundings. According to the Consultancy for Human Rights, Codhes, in the period 1999–2005 more than 260,000 displaced people arrived in Bogotá, approximately 3.8% of the total population of Bogotá. The locations where the majority of the displaced population is concentrated are Ciudad Bolivar, Kennedy, Bosa and Usme.

Ethnic and demographic evolution of Bogotá
Year	Pop.	Bogotá natives		Other Colombians	Foreigners
Year	Pop.	Rolos	Cachacos	Other Colombians	Foreigners
1951	715,250	10,729	693,793	8,047	2,682
1964	1,697,311	135,785	1,425,741	101,839	33,946
1973	2,855,065	356,883	2,141,299	267,662	89,221
1985	4,236,490	783,751	2,668,989	587,813	195,938
1993	5,484,244	1,233,955	3,016,334	925,466	308,489
2005	6,778,691	1,931,927	2,914,837	1,448,945	482,982
2018	7,412,566	2,594,398	2,223,770	1,945,799	648,600
2020	7,743,955	2,787,824	2,168,307	2,090,868	696,956

=== Crime ===
Bogotá has gone to great lengths to change its formerly notorious crime rate and its image with increasing success after having been considered in the 1990s to be one of the most violent cities in the world. In 1993 there were 4,352 murders at a rate of 81 per 100,000 people; in 2007, Bogotá suffered 1,401 murders at a rate of 20 per 100,000 inhabitants, and had a further reduction to 14 per 100,000 inhabitants in 2017 (the lowest since 1979). This success was mainly the result of a participatory and integrated security policy, "Comunidad Segura", that was first adopted in 1995 and continues to be enforced. 1.2 percent of street addresses account for 99 percent of homicides.

==== Insecurity ====
Bogotá has a relatively low level of insecurity compared to other capitals in Latin America. Localities such as Kennedy, Bosa, Ciudad Bolívar, and Los Mártires are the areas where the highest levels of violence are reported. Citizens who feel the most insecure are residents of neighborhoods in the southeast and central areas of the city, particularly those belonging to socioeconomic strata 1 and 2. The population indicates that homicides are related to street robberies, the presence of gangs, and drug trafficking.

As of 2020, Bogotá reported an average of 214 robberies per day, a decrease of 37% compared to the same period in 2019, largely due to the quarantine decreed by the national government as a response to COVID-19. However, robberies increased again after this measure ended.

A report by the Bogotá Metropolitan Police in 2013 indicated that thefts exceeded forecasts, reaching around 24,000 cases, not including incidents that were not reported due to fear or lack of infrastructure for filing complaints. Street theft decreased slightly (from 51% to 49%), as did theft on public transportation (from 19% to 17%). However, robberies in commercial establishments doubled (from 8% to 16%) between 2013 and 2014. In the automotive sector, an average of four car thefts per day is reported, including vehicles belonging to entities such as the police. The most vulnerable localities are Kennedy and Usaquén; authorities maintain that most cases are due to carelessness on the part of owners.

The armed conflict in Colombia has made its capital the scene of several terrorist attacks. Since the 1980s, Bogotá has been a target of drug traffickers and illegal armed groups.

On 7 February 2003, the explosion of a car bomb in a parking lot at the El Nogal Club in the northern part of the city left 36 people dead and more than 200 injured. The attack was claimed by the FARC guerrilla group. That same year, a car bomb exploded in front of a shopping center, killing six people and injuring 12.

On 12 August 2010, a car bomb was detonated in front of a complex of buildings that house, among other companies, Caracol Radio. The attack left nine people injured.

On 15 May 2012, a magnetic bomb exploded at the intersection of 74th Street and Caracas Avenue, near the financial district. The attack targeted former Minister of the Interior Fernando Londoño, who was injured; two people were killed.

On 19 February 2017, an explosion in the La Macarena neighborhood left one police officer dead and 26 people injured, including 24 members of the Mobile Anti-Riot Squad. The ELN guerrilla group claimed responsibility for the attack.

On 17 January 2019, a car bomb exploded at the General Santander Police Cadet School located in the southern part of the city, resulting in the deaths of at least 21 people and 68 injuries.

== Government ==
Bogotá is the capital of the Republic of Colombia, and houses the Congress, Supreme Court of Justice and the center of the executive administration as well as the residence of the President (Casa de Nariño). These buildings, along with the Office of the Mayor, the Lievano Palace (Palacio Liévano), are located within a few meters from each other on the Plaza de Bolívar. The square is located in the city's historical center, La Candelaria, which features architecture in Spanish Colonial and Spanish Baroque styles.

The Mayor of Bogotá and the City Council – both elected by popular vote – are responsible for city administration. In 2023 Carlos Fernando Galán was elected Mayor; his term runs from 2024 to 2027.

=== Localities ===
The city is divided into 20 localities: Usaquén, Chapinero, Santa Fe, San Cristóbal, Usme, Tunjuelito, Bosa, Kennedy, Fontibón, Engativá, Suba, Barrios Unidos, Teusaquillo, Los Mártires, Antonio Nariño, Puente Aranda, La Candelaria, Rafael Uribe Uribe, Ciudad Bolívar and Sumapaz.

Each of the 20 localities is governed by an administrative board elected by popular vote, made up of no fewer than seven members. The Mayor designates local mayors from candidates nominated by the respective administrative board.

=== Neighbourhoods ===
- Normandía
- Quiroga
- Ciudad Bolívar

== Economy ==
Bogotá is the main economic and industrial center of Colombia. The Colombian government fosters the import of capital goods, Bogotá being one of the main destinations of these imports.

=== Tourism ===
The metro contributes to 38% of Colombia's GDP. (150 billion dollars in 2024) Travel and tourism's share of the city's overall GDP stands at 2.5%. Bogotá is responsible for 56% of the tourism that arrives to Colombia and is home to 1,423 multinational companies. Bogotá also ranks highly as a global city for doing business and holding meetings. Bogotá is a growing destination for international meetings.

In 2016, Bogotá has won 50 major international events, with 12 more world-class events in progress. The 16th World Summit of Nobel Peace Laureates took place from 2 to 5 February 2017 in Bogotá, Colombia.

One Young World is the global forum for young leaders aged 18–30. Bogotá was the host city for Summit 2017.

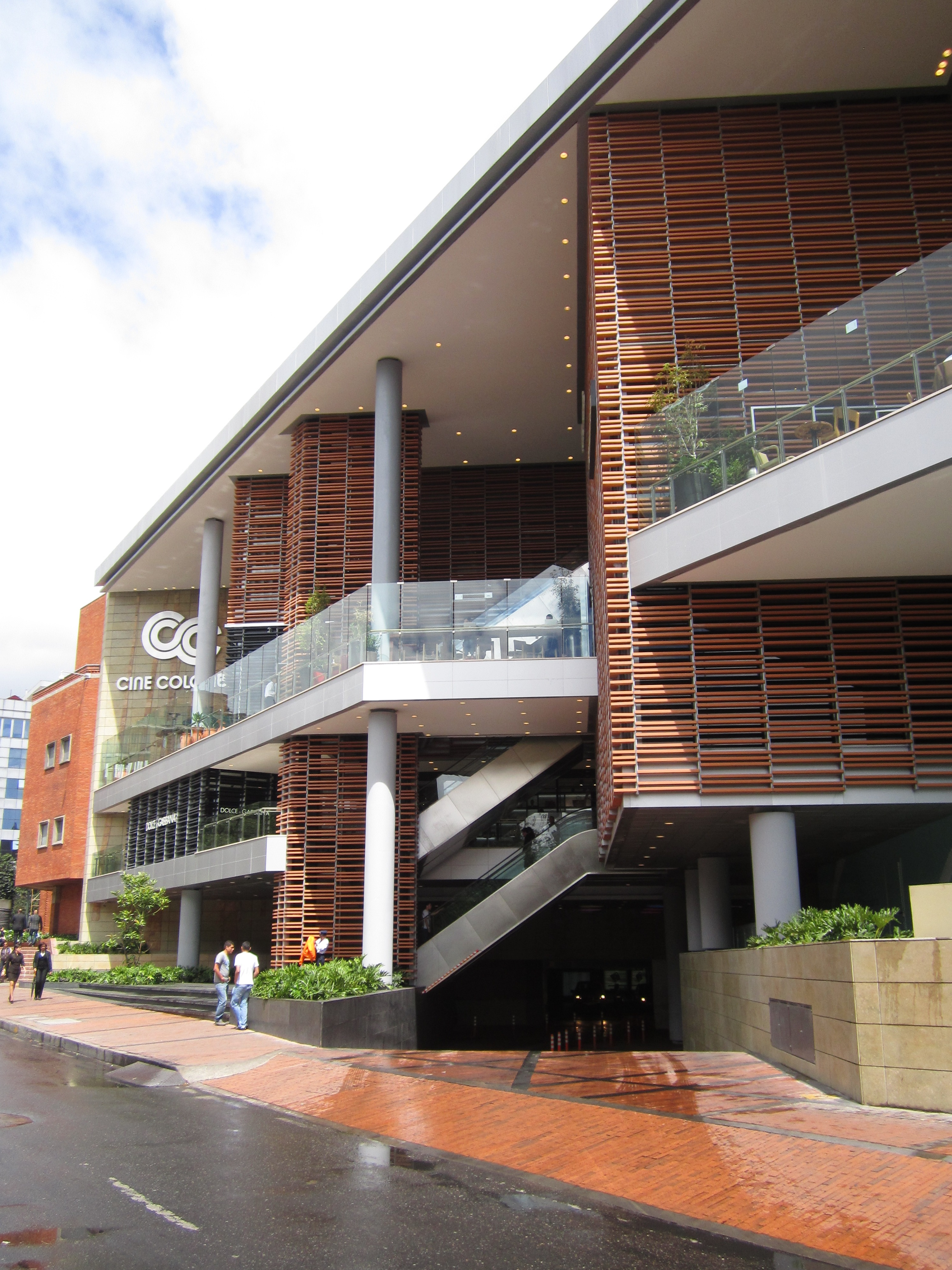
The Centro Andino

The hotels in the historical center of La Candelaria and its surrounding areas cater to lovers of culture and the arts. This area also has the bulk of hostels in the city as well. In La Candelaria, there are many museums, including the Botero Museum and the Gold Museum. Close to La Candelaria is the Cerro Monserrate, which you can reach by cable car or funicular. The hotels located near Ciudad Salitre are intended for visitors who make short stops in Bogotá and near El Dorado International Airport.

Important landmarks and tourist stops in Bogotá include the botanical garden José Celestino Mutis, the Quinta de Bolívar, the national observatory, the planetarium, Maloka, the Colpatria observation point, the observation point of La Calera, the monument of the American flags, and La Candelaria (the historical district of the city). There is also Usaquen, a colonial landmark where brunch and a flea market on Sundays is a traditional activity. The city has numerous green parks and amusement parks like Salitre Magico or Mundo Aventura.

Green areas surrounding Bogotá are perfect locations for eco-tourism and hiking activities. In the eastern mountains of the city, just a few minutes walking from main roads, there are Quebrada La vieja and Chapinero Waterfalls, two of many green spots for sightseeing and tourism with clean air.

There are also several areas of the city where fine restaurants can be found. The G Zone, the T Zone, and La Macarena are well known for their gastronomic offerings.

Since the 2000s, major hotel chains have established themselves in the city. Bogotá has a great cultural diversity, coming from different regions of the country, which allows tourists to know the multiculturalism of the country without the need to travel to other cities, this includes gastronomy and different festivals.

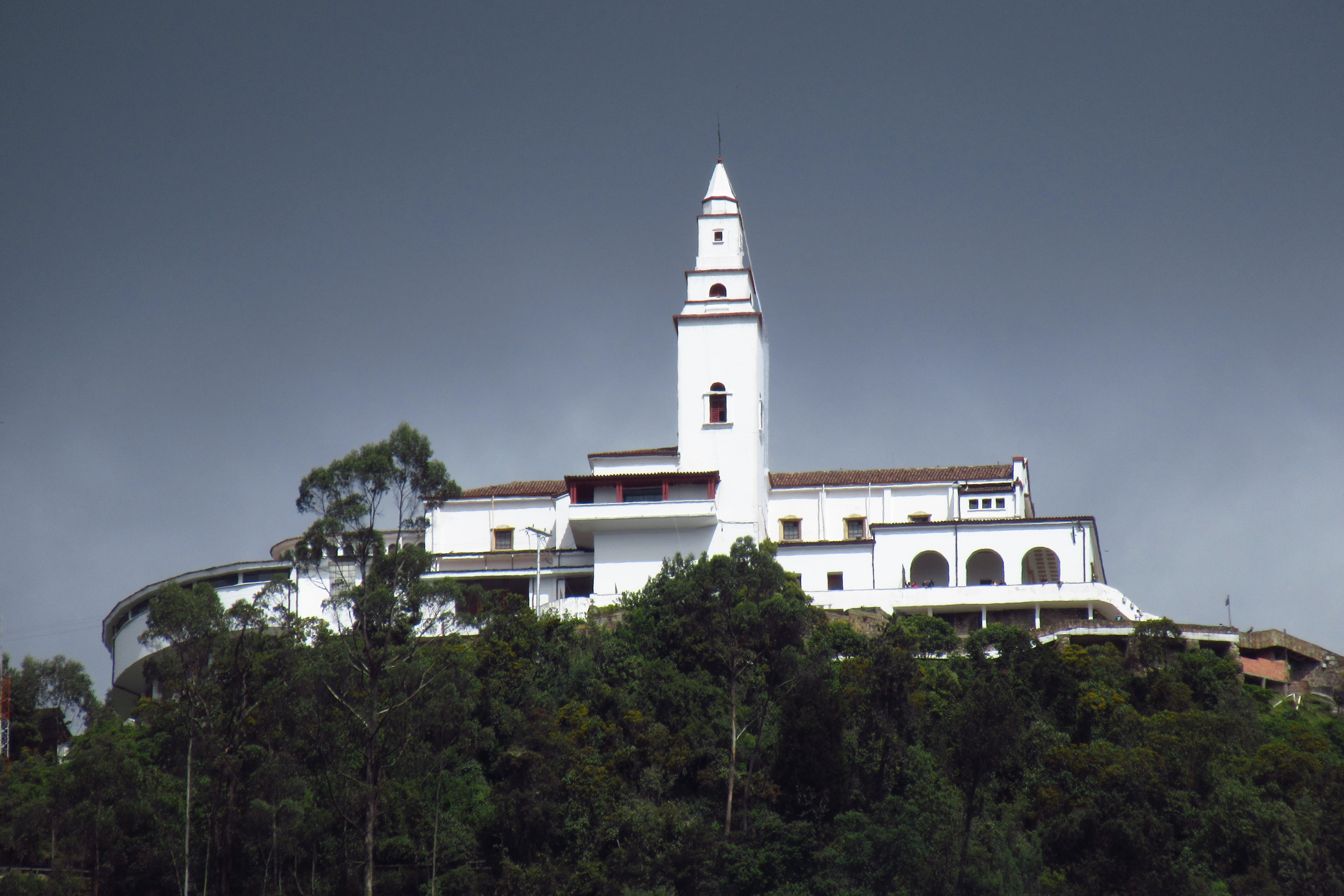
Monserrate Sanctuary at top of Monserrate mount

Atlantis Plaza Mall, featuring the Hard Rock Cafe

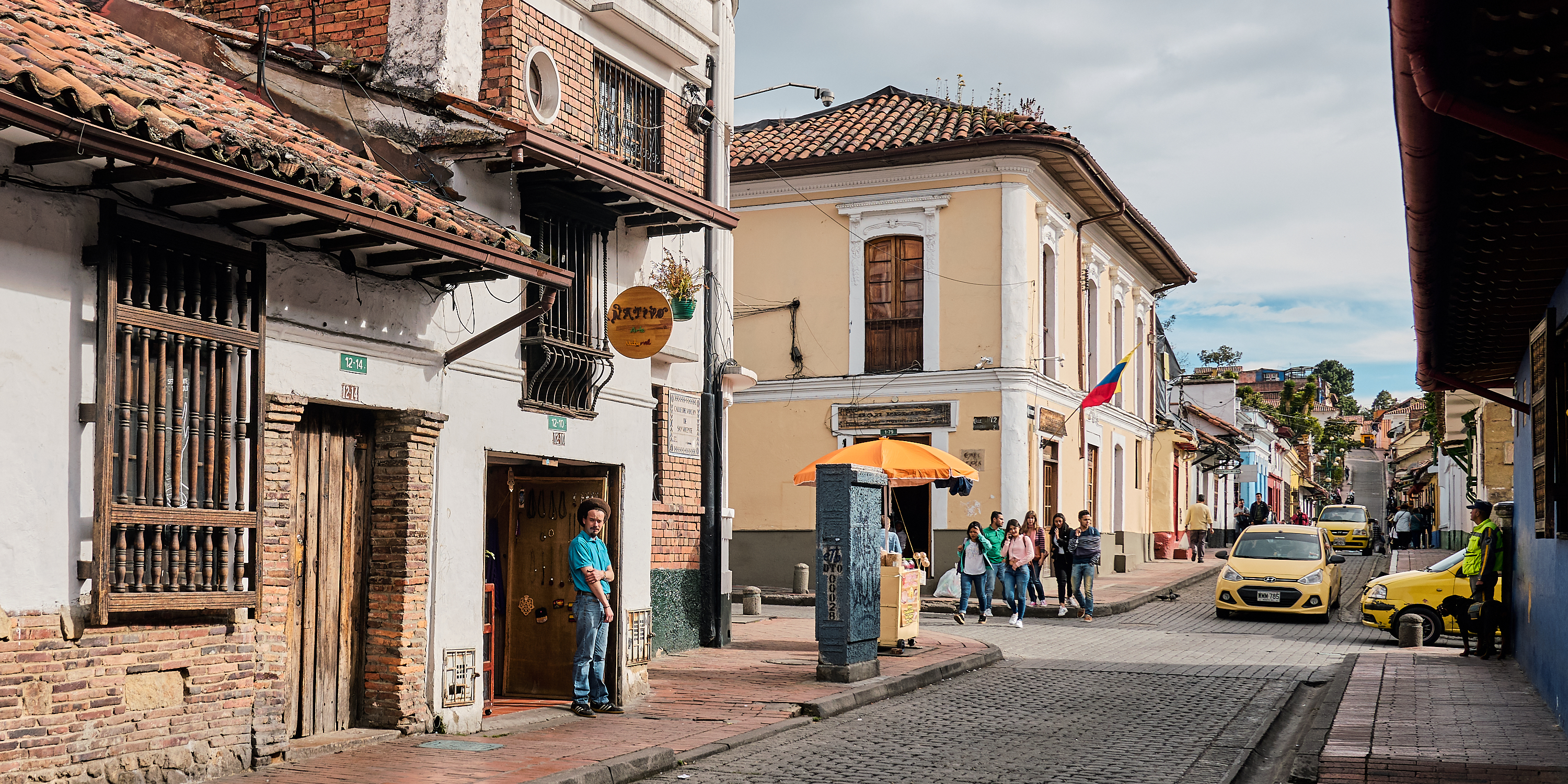
La Candelaria, the historical district of the city

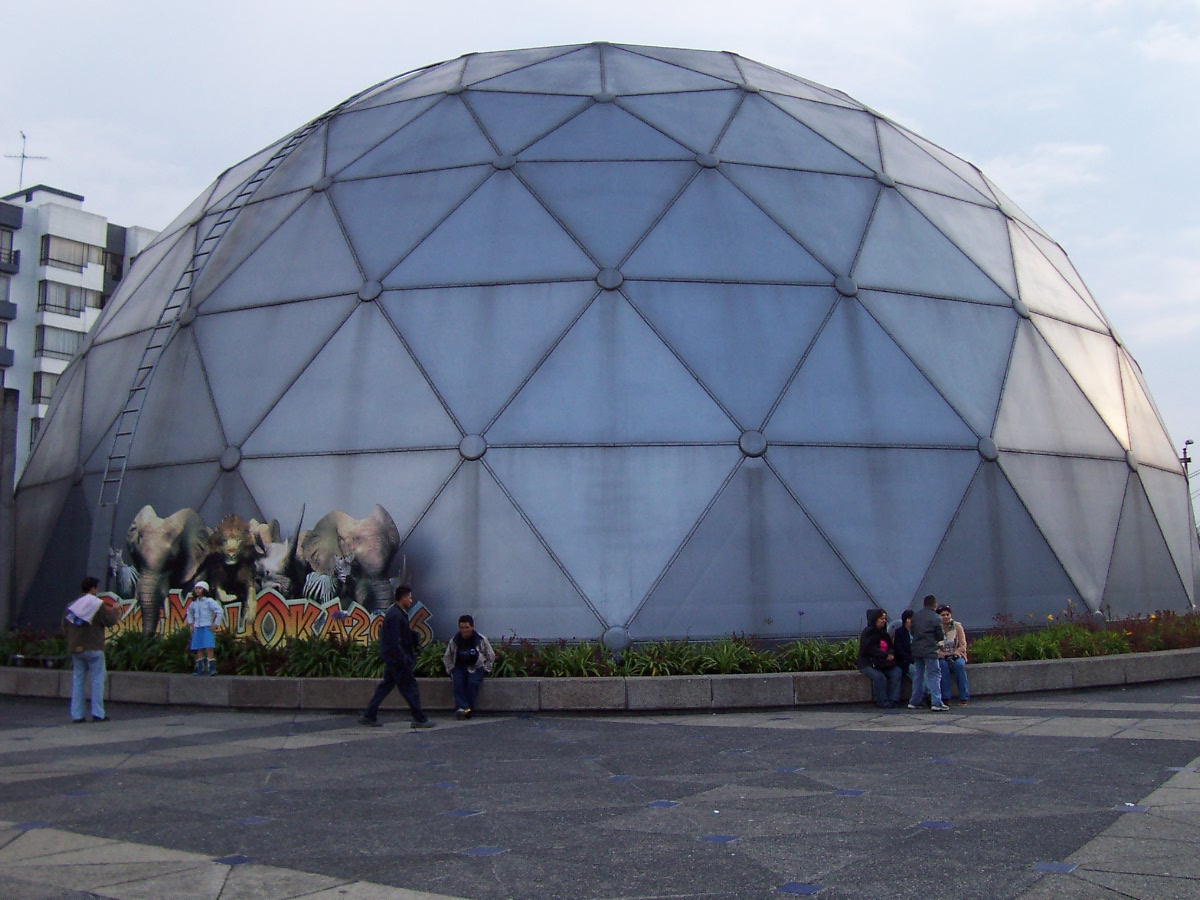
Maloka Museum

=== Shopping malls ===
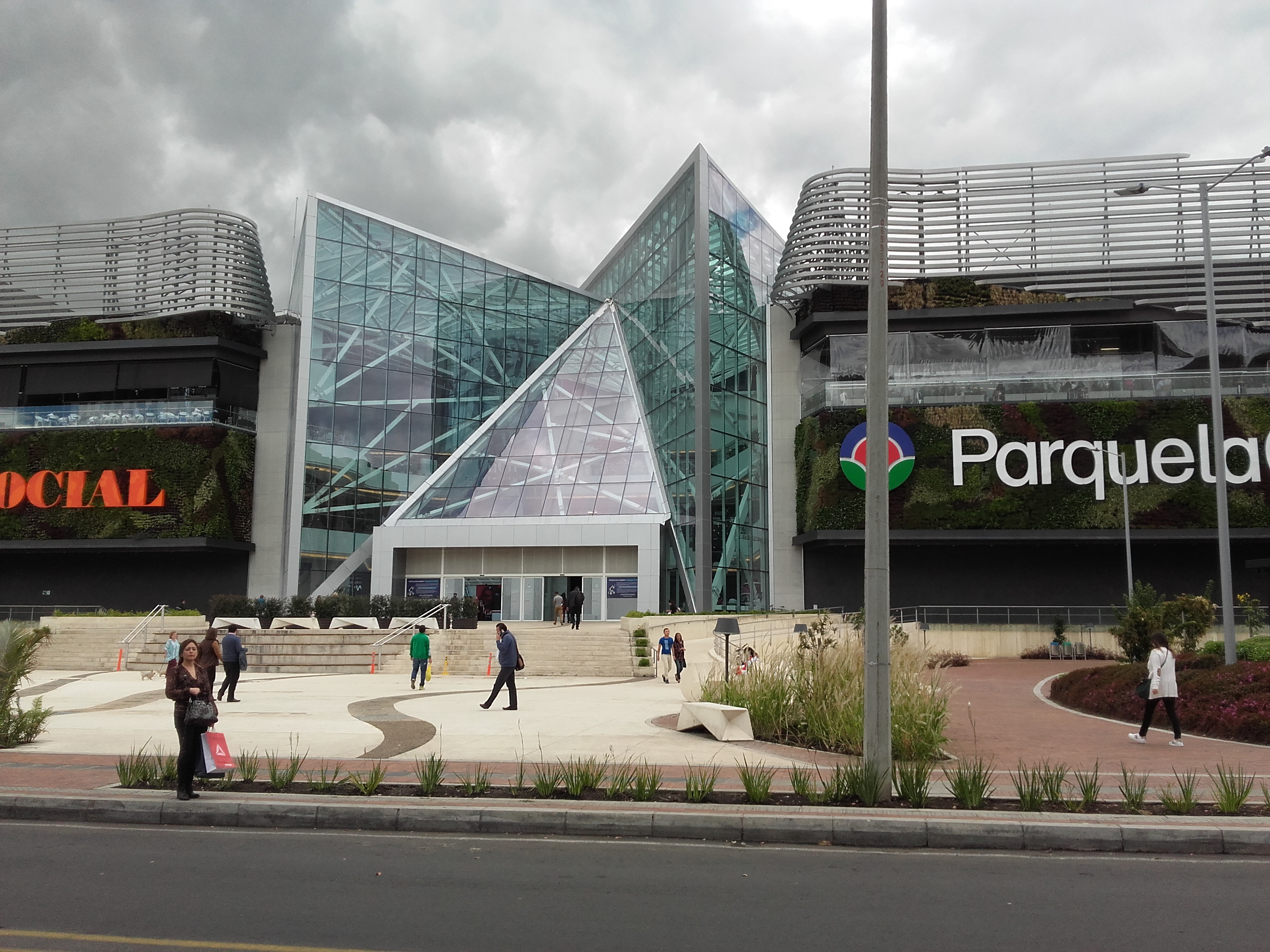
Parque La Colina Shopping Mall

Bogotá's economy has been significantly boosted due to new shopping malls built within the last few years. As of December 2011, over 160 new malls are planned in addition to the existing 100 malls. Notable malls include:

- Centro Andino
- Centro Mayor
- Santafé
- Gran Estación
- Portal de la 80
- Titán Plaza
- Calima
- Atlantis Plaza
- Unicentro
- Hayuelos
- Pasadena
- Iserra 100
- Colina
- Hacienda Santa Barbara
- Metropolis

== Media ==
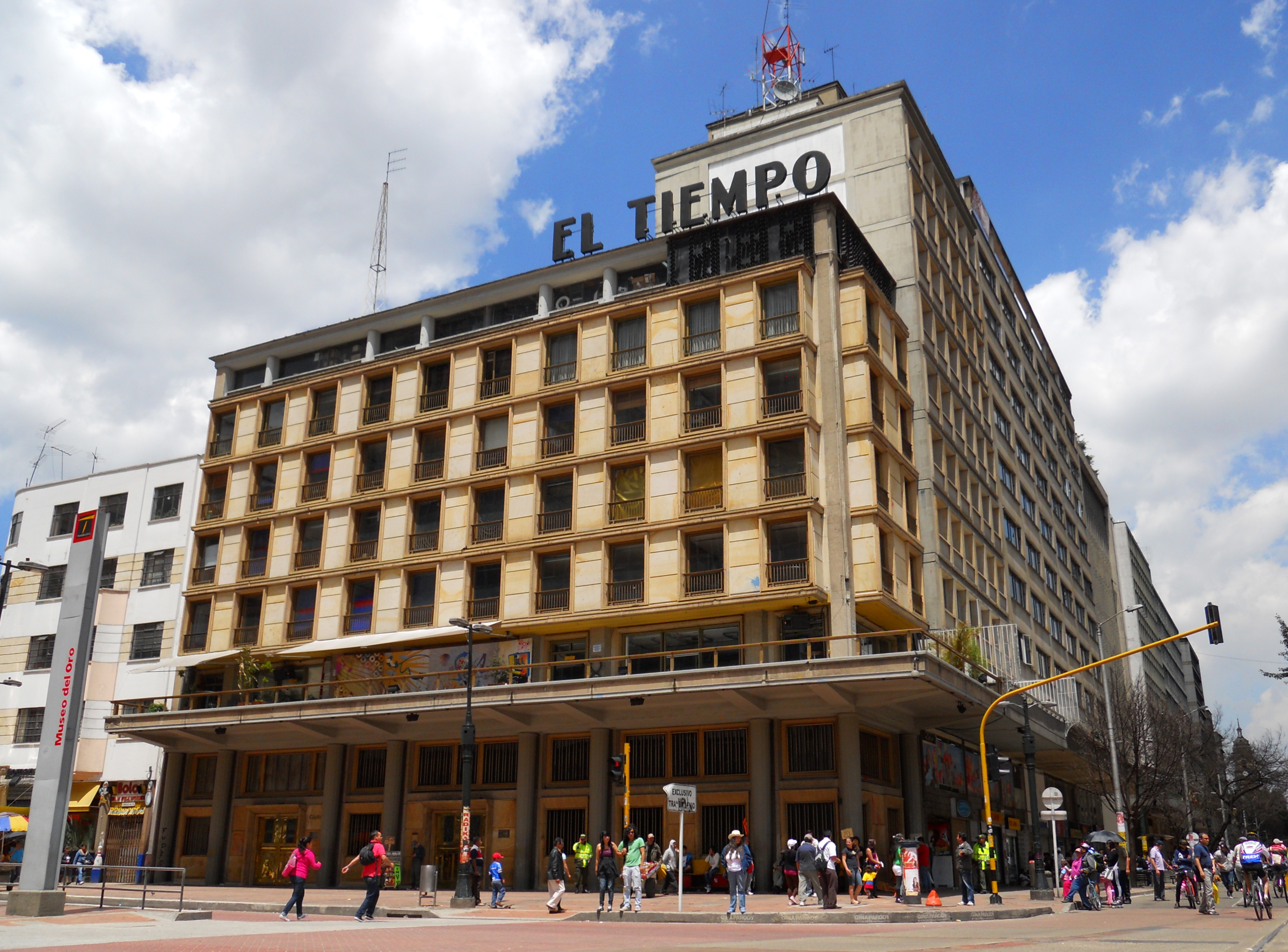
El Tiempo Building, located on Avenida Jiménez and Carrera 7

Bogotá is home to several television stations: the local channels Canal Capital and Citytv, the regional Canal 13, and the national channels Caracol TV, RCN TV, Canal Uno, Canal Institucional, and Señal Colombia. It has multiple satellite television services like Telefónica, Claro and DirecTV and several satellite dishes which offer hundreds of international channels, plus several exclusive channels for Bogotá. The Colombian capital is also the headquarters of the Spanish language version of France's international news channel France 24.

In Bogotá, all the major radio networks in the country are available, in both AM and FM; 70% of the FM stations offer RDS service. There are several newspapers, including El Tiempo, El Espectador and El Nuevo Siglo, plus economical dailies La República and Portafolio, tabloids El Espacio, Q'Hubo, and Extra. Bogotá also offers three free newspapers, two Spanish, ADN and Publimetro, and one English, The Bogotá Post.

== Infrastructure ==
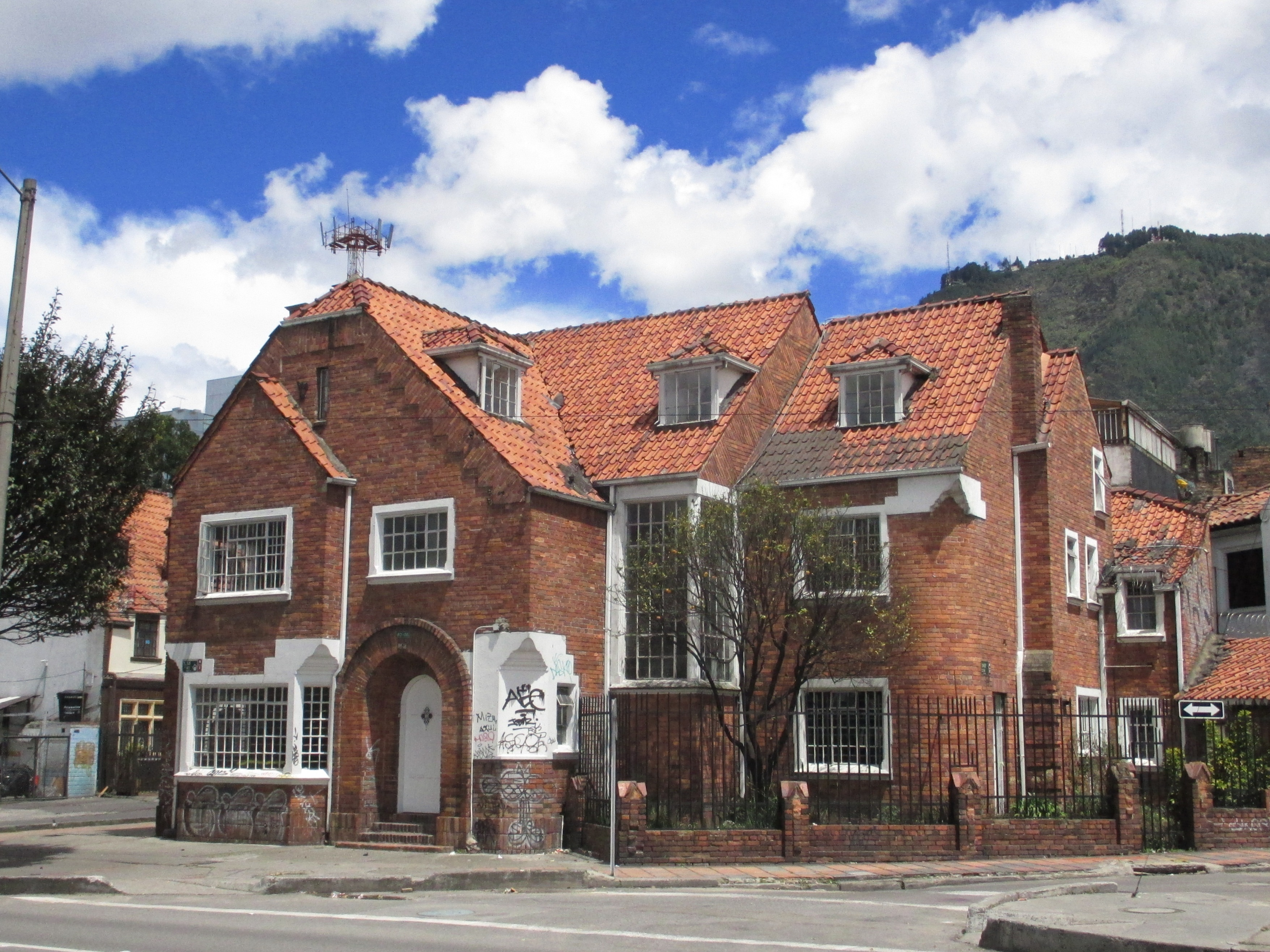
An old house in the Teusaquillo locality, near downtown Bogotá (Estrato 4)

Energy and sewer bills are stratified based on the location of owner's residence, The system is the classification of the residential properties that should receive public services. Although the system does not consider the income per person and the rules say that the residential real estate should stratify and not households. All mayors should do the stratification of residential properties of their municipality or district.

Bogotá's social strata have been divided as follows and have been extensively used by the government as a reference to develop social welfare programs, statistical information and to some degree for the assignment of lands.

- Estrato 1 (lowest)
- Estrato 2 (low)
- Estrato 3 (mid-low)
- Estrato 4 (mid-high)
- Estrato 5 (high)
- Estrato 6 (highest)

== Transport ==
In addition to TransMilenio, the Peñalosa administration and voter-approved referendums helped to establish travel restrictions on cars with certain license plate numbers during peak hours called Pico y placa (peak, as in hour, and plate, as in license plate); 121 kilometers (75 miles) of Ciclovía on Sundays and major holidays; a massive system (376 km (234 mi) as of 2013) of bicycle paths and segregated lanes called ciclorrutas; and the removal of thousands of parking spots in an attempt to make roads more pedestrian-friendly and discourage car use. Ciclorrutas is one of the most extensive dedicated bike path networks of any city in the world, with a total extension of 376 kilometers (234 miles). It extends from the north of the city, 170th Street, to the south, 27th Street, and from Monserrate on the east to the Bogotá River on the west. The ciclorruta was started by the 1995–1998 Antanas Mockus administration with a few kilometers, and considerably extended afterwards with the development of a Bicycle Master Plan and the addition of paths hundreds of kilometers in extent. Since the construction of the ciclorruta bicycle use in the city has increased, and a car free week was introduced in 2014.

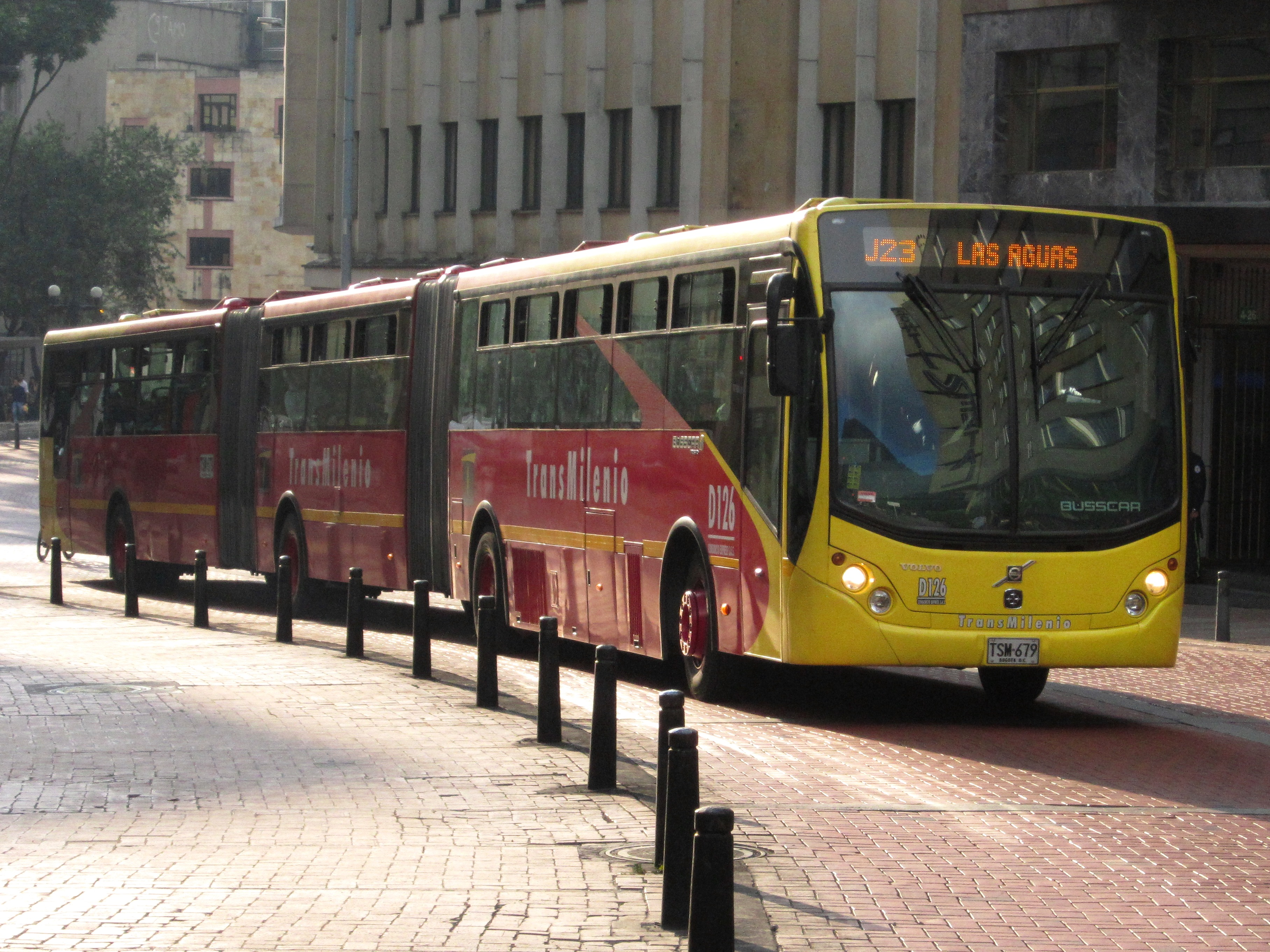
Bi-articulated TransMilenio bus

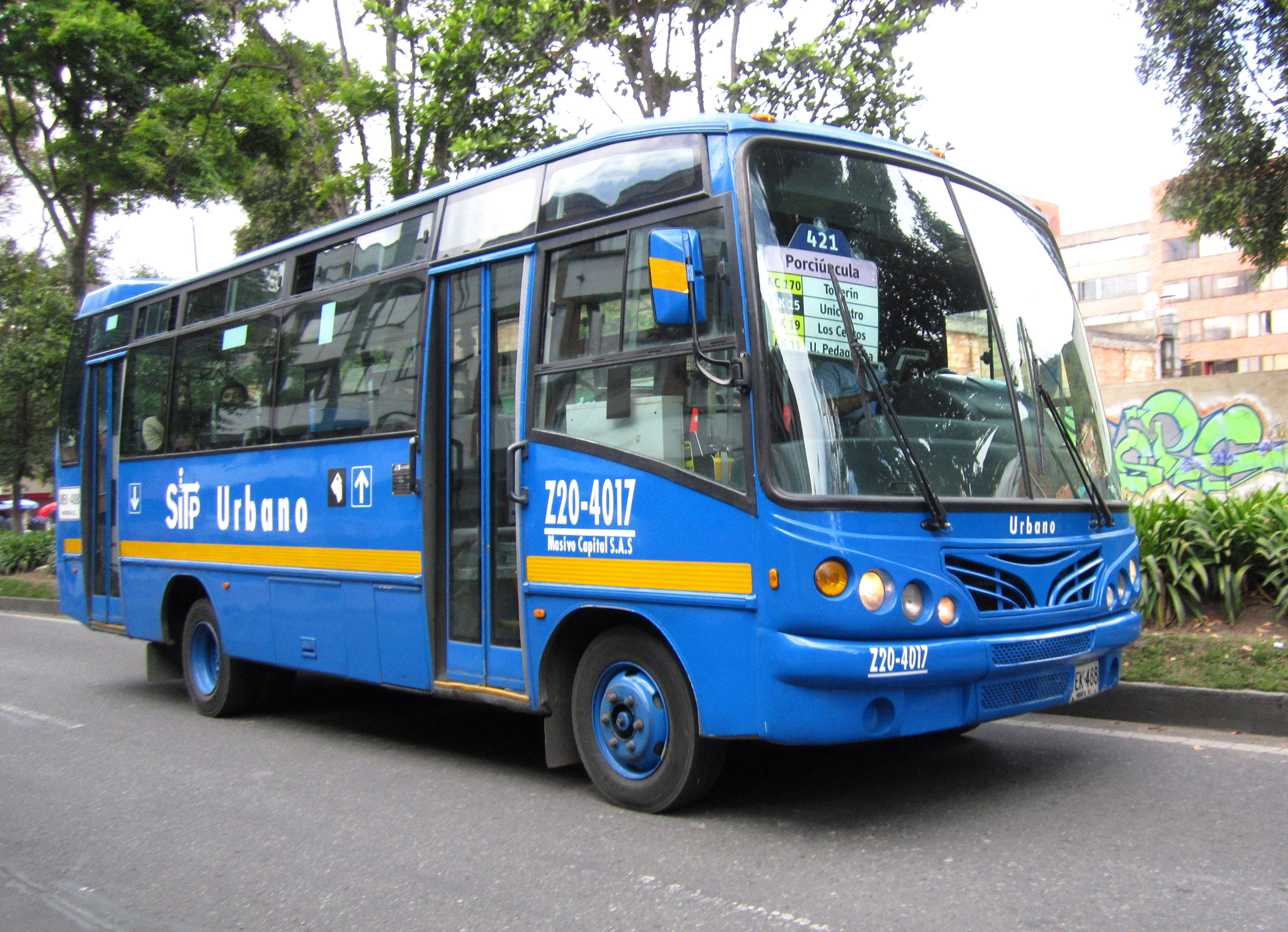
Urban (SITP) bus, part of the integrated public transport system

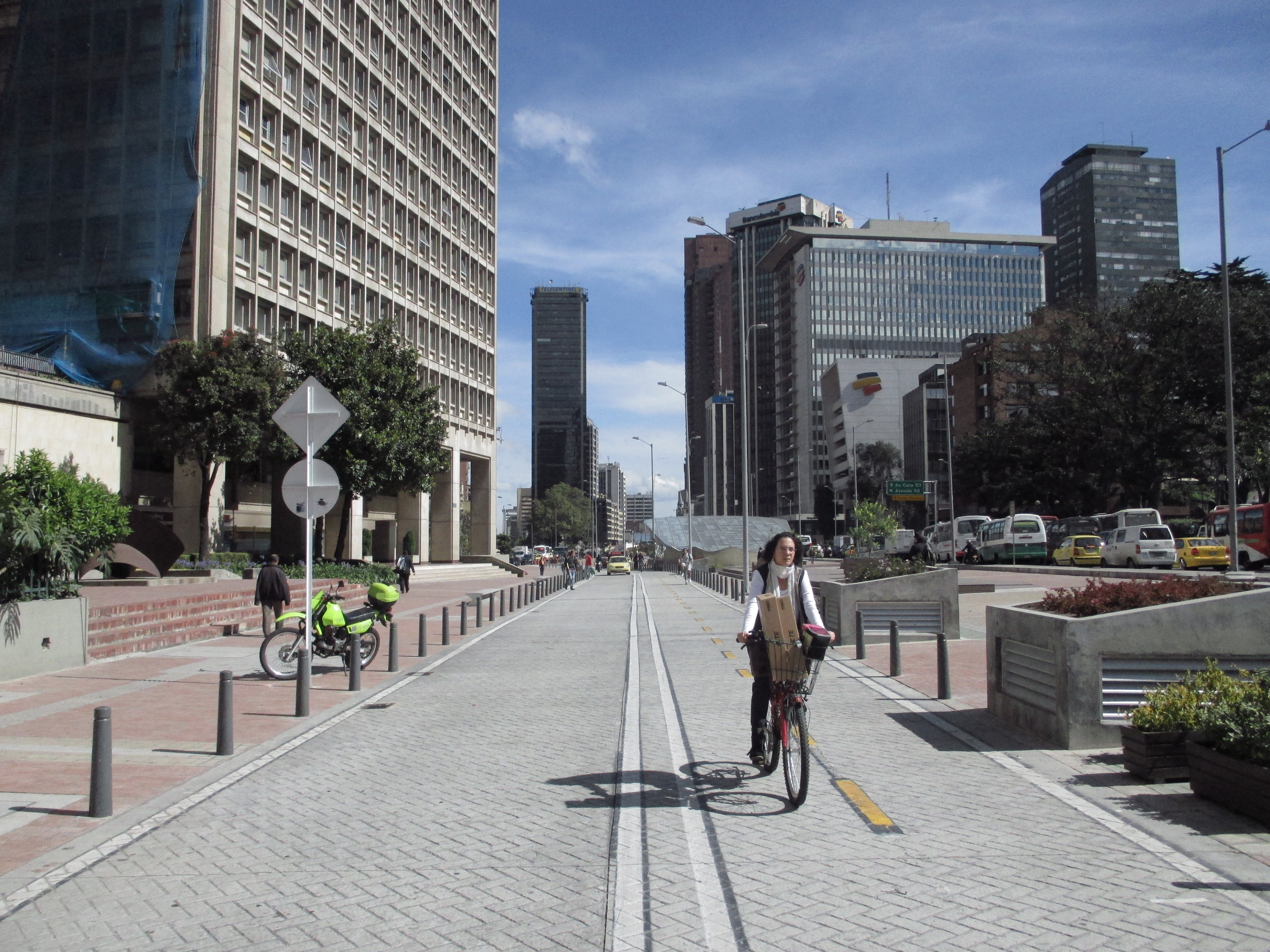
Bikepath in central Bogotá

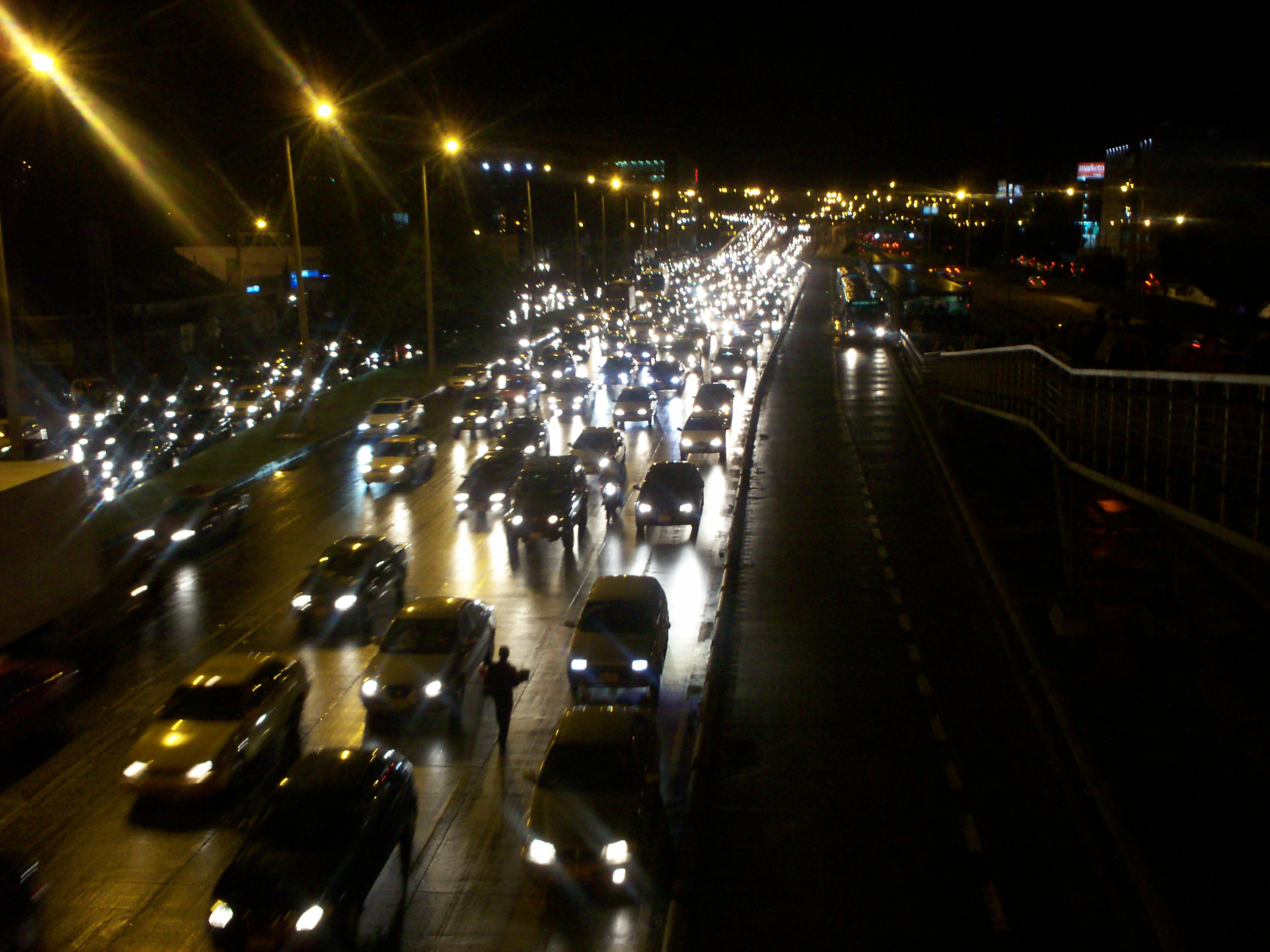
Traffic on the Northern Highway (Autopista Norte)

=== Roads ===
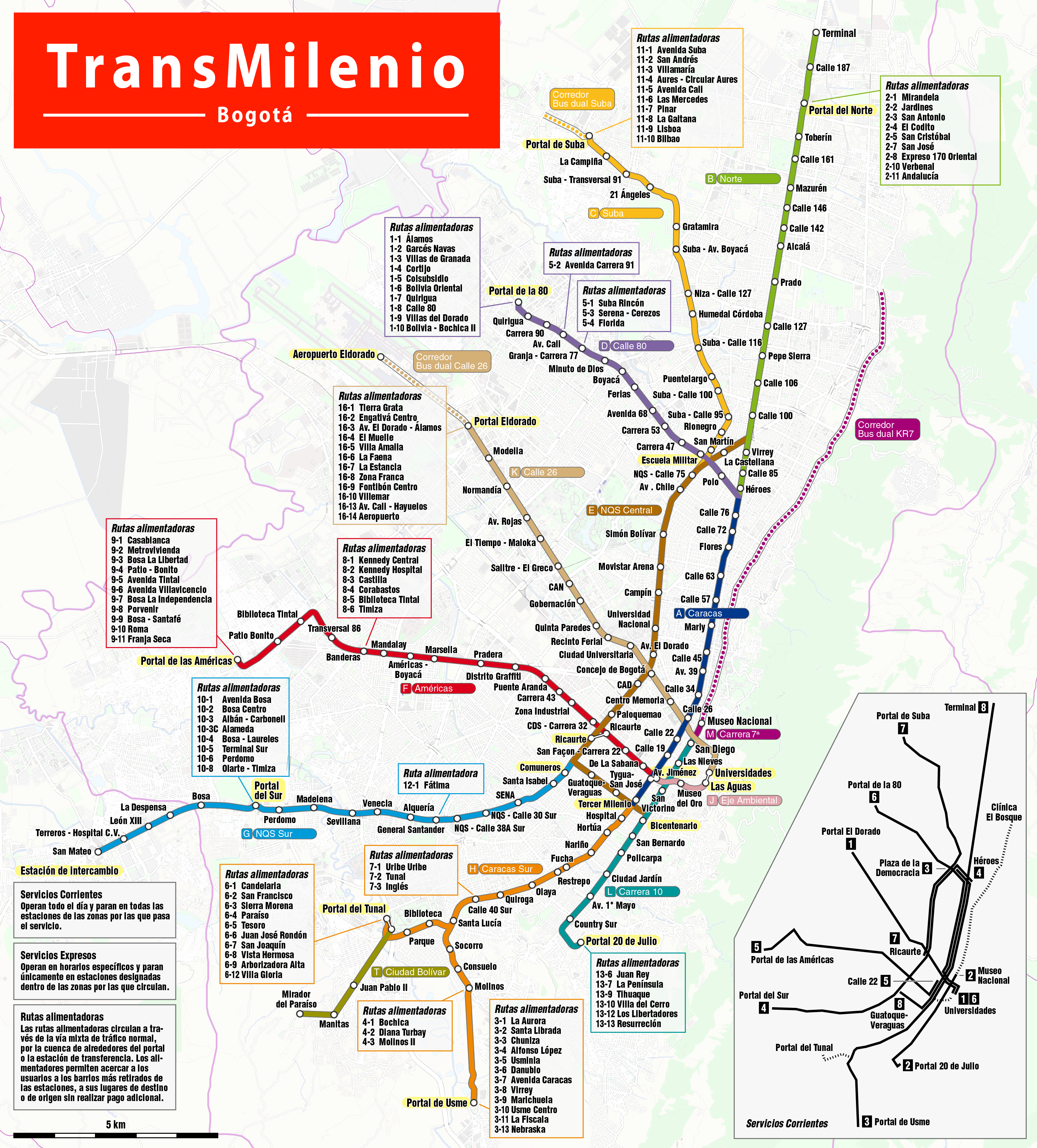
Map of the TransMilenio system

In addition to this, the metropolis currently has over 650 kilometers of urban bicycle paths divided among its 20 boroughs, making it the city with the largest bicycle lane system on the planet. Bogotá's massive urban growth during the 20th and 21st centuries due to immigration and rapid urbanization of neighboring cities has placed a strain on the city's downtown avenues and highways, but since the creation of the Bogota Metropolitan area in 1990 significant efforts to upgrade the city's infrastructure have been undertaken, including the construction of several new avenues and boulevards, as well as the construction of the first two lines of the Bogota Metro. In recent years, the capital district has embarked on several city building projects including the expansion of the Avenida Boyaca and Autopista Norte, as well as the construction of the brand new Avenida Guayacanes, a 13-kilometer 8-lane avenue currently being constructed from scratch in the boroughs of Bosa and Kennedy, as well as the excavations for the city's second metro line. Private car ownership forms a major part of the congestion, in addition to taxis, buses, and commercial vehicles.

=== Buses ===
Buses remain the main means of mass transit. There are two bus systems: the traditional system and the TransMilenio BRT system. The city's administration is currently in the process of replacing and updating the entire fleet for the TransMilenio BRT system, adopting Euro VI-standard CNG-powered buses as well as electric buses. Once completed, Bogotá will have the largest electric bus fleet in the world outside China.

The traditional system runs a variety of bus types, operated by several companies on normal streets and avenues: Bus (large buses), Buseta (medium size buses) and Colectivo (vans or minivans). The bigger buses were divided into two categories: Ejecutivo, which was originally to be a deluxe service and was not to carry standing passengers, and corriente or normal service. Since May 2008, all buses run as corriente services. Bogotá is a hub for domestic and international bus routes. The Bogotá terminal serves routes to most cities and towns in Colombia and is the largest in the country. There is international service to Ecuador, Peru and Venezuela.

The TransMilenio system was created during Enrique Peñalosa's mayoral term, and is a form of bus rapid transit that has been deployed as a measure to compensate for the lack of a subway or rail system. TransMilenio combines articulated buses that operate on dedicated bus roads (busways) and smaller buses (feeders) that operate in residential areas, bringing passengers to the main grid. TransMilenio's main routes are: Caracas Avenue, Northern Highway (Autopista Norte), 80th Street, Americas Avenue, Jiménez Avenue, and 30th Avenue (also referred to as Norte Quito Sur or N.Q.S. for short). Routes for Suba Avenue and Southern Highway (Autopista Sur), the southern leg of the 30th Avenue, were opened in April 2006. The third phase of the system will cover 7th Avenue, 10th Avenue, and 26th Street (or Avenida El Dorado). The system is planned to cover the entire city by 2030. Although the Transmilenio carries commuters to numerous corners of the city, it is more expensive (US$0.80 or 2300 COP) than any public transport, except taxis.

=== Air ===
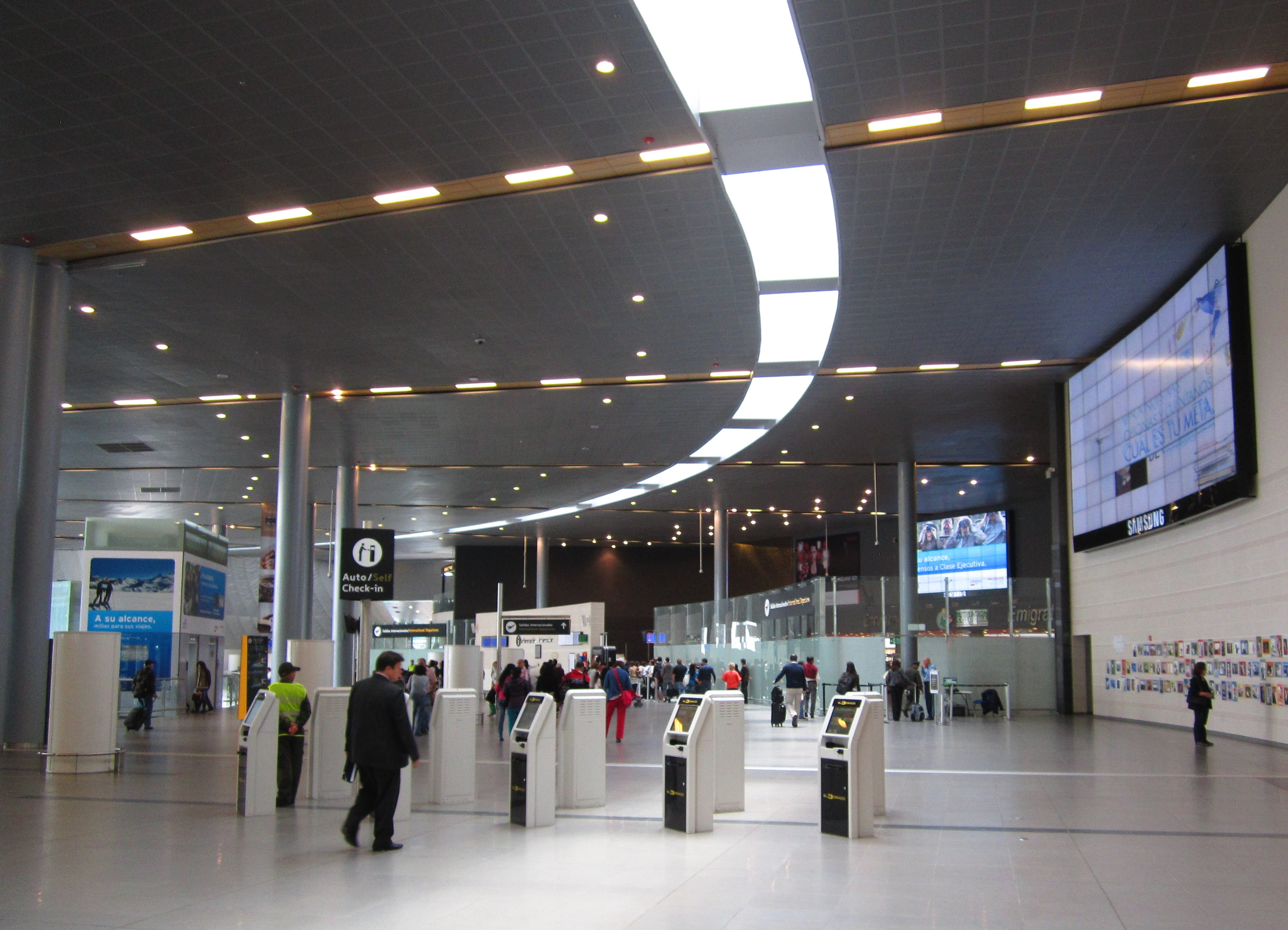
El Dorado International Airport

Bogotá's main airport is El Dorado International Airport, with an approximate area of 6.9 km^{2} (2.7 sq mi) located west of the city's downtown in the Fontibón Locality. Globally known as The Hub of the Americas, it is the busiest airport in Latin America and Colombia. Construction of the airport was ordered by Gustavo Rojas Pinilla (19th President of Colombia) in 1955 to replace the Techo Airport. Due to its central location in Colombia and in Latin America, it is a hub for Colombia's Flagship Carrier Avianca, Copa Airlines Colombia and LATAM Colombia. It is also serviced by a number of international airlines including American, Delta, United, Air France, KLM, Turkish Airlines, Edelweiss, Lufthansa, Emirates, Iberia and Air Canada. The national airport has begun to take more responsibility due to the congestion at the international airport. In response to the high demand of approximately 27 Million passengers per year,

A secondary airport, CATAM, serves as a base for Military and Police Aviation. This airport, which uses the runways of El Dorado will eventually move to Madrid, a nearby town in the region of Cundinamarca, leaving further space to expand El Dorado.

Guaymaral Airport is another small airport located in the northern boundaries of Bogotá. It is used mainly for private aviation activities.

=== Gondola lift ===
TransMiCable is a gondola lift system implemented by the city of Bogotá, with the purpose of providing a complementary transportation service to TransMilenio. Line T, with a length of 3.34 km and four stations, connects the Portal del Tunal (TransMilenio) station to Mirador del Paraíso station in the steep hills of Ciudad Bolívar district and was opened on 27 December 2018. It is part of the city's Integrated Public Transport System, along with TransMilenio and the urban, complementary and special bus services operating on neighbourhoods and main streets. Two more lines are under development.

=== Water ===
In 2024, the City Council approved a megaproject that would be carried out in three phases: the first phase would be implemented in the first year, with a main port, docks and vessels all along the Bogotá River, at a cost of 250 billion pesos and would contemplate the transport of up to 120,000 passengers per day, with seven possible routes that would cover distances such as from the boroughs of Suba to Bosa (with the El Dorado International Airport station in between) in a time no longer than 40 minutes. The next two phases, which would also require an investment of nearly 250 billion pesos, would be aimed at strengthening the system and increasing passenger capacity. With this measure, the Bogotá River is expected to become a vital artery for transport and regional connectivity, improving citizens' quality of life and fostering more balanced and sustainable urban development.

=== Rail ===
==== Urban rail ====
Bogotá has little railway transit infrastructure, following the collapse of the tram network, although a number of plans hope to change that. The Bogotá Metro has been pushed forward by two successive governments, and construction began in 2020 with opening planned for 2028.

==== Suburban rail ====
Plans to construct railways in and out of the city, replacing defunct routes, have been delayed due to the pressing need for transport within the city. A tram train line using right-of-way from the defunct Bogotá Savannah Railway, known as RegioTram, is being constructed.

==== History ====
On 25 December 1884, the first tramway pulled by mules was inaugurated and covered the route from Plaza de Bolívar to Chapinero, and in 1892, the line connecting Plaza de Bolívar and La Sabana Station started operating. The tramway ran over wooden rails and was easily derailed, so steel rails imported from Britain were eventually installed. In 1894, a tramway car ran the Bogotá–Chapinero line every 20 minutes. The tram system eventually grew to cover most of the city and its surrounding suburbs. But during the Bogotazo riots of 1948, the system suffered heavy damage and was forced to close. The economic effects of the subsequent civil war that followed prevented the damage from being repaired. Parts of the system continued to operate in a reduced state until 1951, when they were replaced by buses. Most of the streetcar tracks were eventually paved over, but exposed tracks can still be seen on many of the older roads of the city, especially downtown and in the La Candelaria area, although it has been about 70 years since any vehicles have run on them.

=== Cycling ===
Bogotá has most extensive and comprehensive network of bike paths in Colombia. Bogotá's bike paths network or Ciclorrutas de Bogotá in Spanish, designed and built during the administration of Mayors Antanas Mockus and Enrique Peñalosa, is also one of the most extensive in the world and the most extensive in Latin America. The network is integrated with the TransMilenio bus system which has bicycle parking facilities, therefore rendering it feasible to cross the entire metropolitan area while riding a bike.

Bogotá implemented a healthy lifestyle program called "Ciclovía", through which principal highways are closed from 7:00 a.m. until 2:00 pm on Sundays and public holidays. Thanks to the "Ciclovía", the general population rides its bikes enjoying the city as well as exercising. In addition, cars do not circulate as heavily, so there is less pollution. Along the same lines, just during the month of December, the same activity is carried out at night; there are some special amenities and activities, such as fireworks, street theater performances, and street food vendors.

Since 4 April 2016 the carrera 11 has been reduced from four to three car lanes and a new bike lane (ciclorruta) has been inaugurated.

=== Public transport statistics ===
The average time spent commuting via public transit in Bogotá on a weekday (for example, to and from work) is 97 minutes total. 32% of riders spend more than 2 hours each day riding on public transportation. The average time spent waiting at a stop or station for public transit to arrive is 20 minutes, while 40% of riders wait for over 20 minutes every day. The average distance traveled via public transit is 8 kilometers, with 16% of trips being over 12 kilometers in a single direction.

== Education ==
Known as the Athens of South America, Bogotá has an extensive educational system of both primary and secondary schools and colleges. Due to the constant migration of people into the nation's capital, the availability of quotas for access to education offered by the State free of charge is often insufficient. The city also has a diverse system of colleges and private schools.

There are a number of universities, both public and private. In 2002, there were a total of 113 higher education institutions; in Bogotá there are several universities, most partially or fully accredited by the NAC (National Accreditation Council): National University of Colombia, University of the Andes, Colombia, District University of Bogotá, La Salle University, Colombia, University of La Sabana, Pontifical Xavierian University, Our Lady of the Rosary University, Universidad Externado de Colombia, Nueva Granada Military University, Central University, Colombia, El Bosque University, University of America, Sergio Arboleda University, Jorge Tadeo Lozano University, Pilot University of Colombia, Catholic University of Colombia, Saint Thomas Aquinas University and Universidad Pedagógica Nacional.

The city has a University City at the National University of Colombia campus located in the traditional sector Teusaquillo. It is the largest campus in Colombia and one of the largest in Latin America.

A private school, Chapinero's English Royal School (Colegio Inglaterra Real de Chapinero), existed from 2008 until 2021, when it closed due to the COVID-19 pandemic.

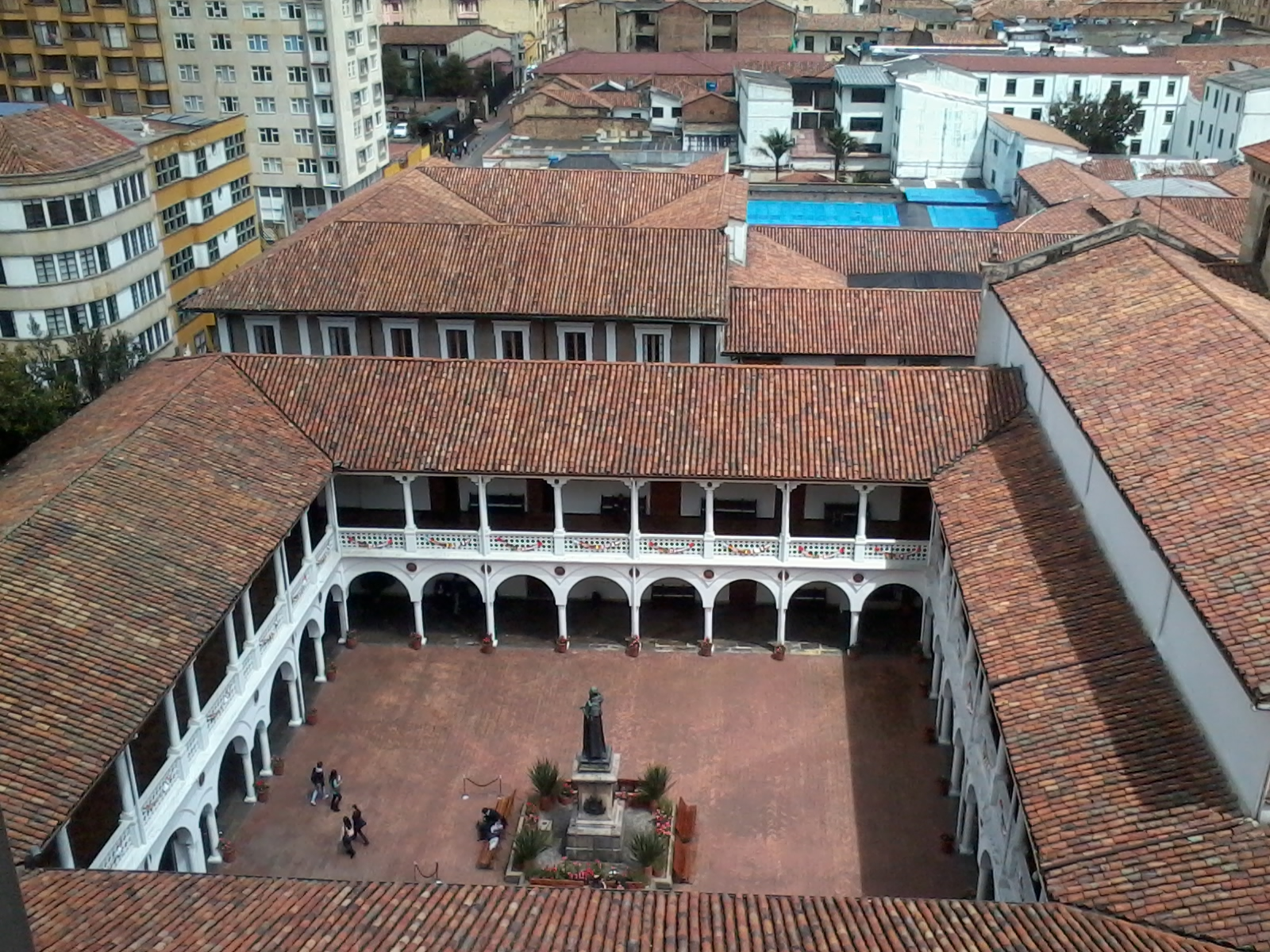
The Del Rosario University housed in its Colonial era building

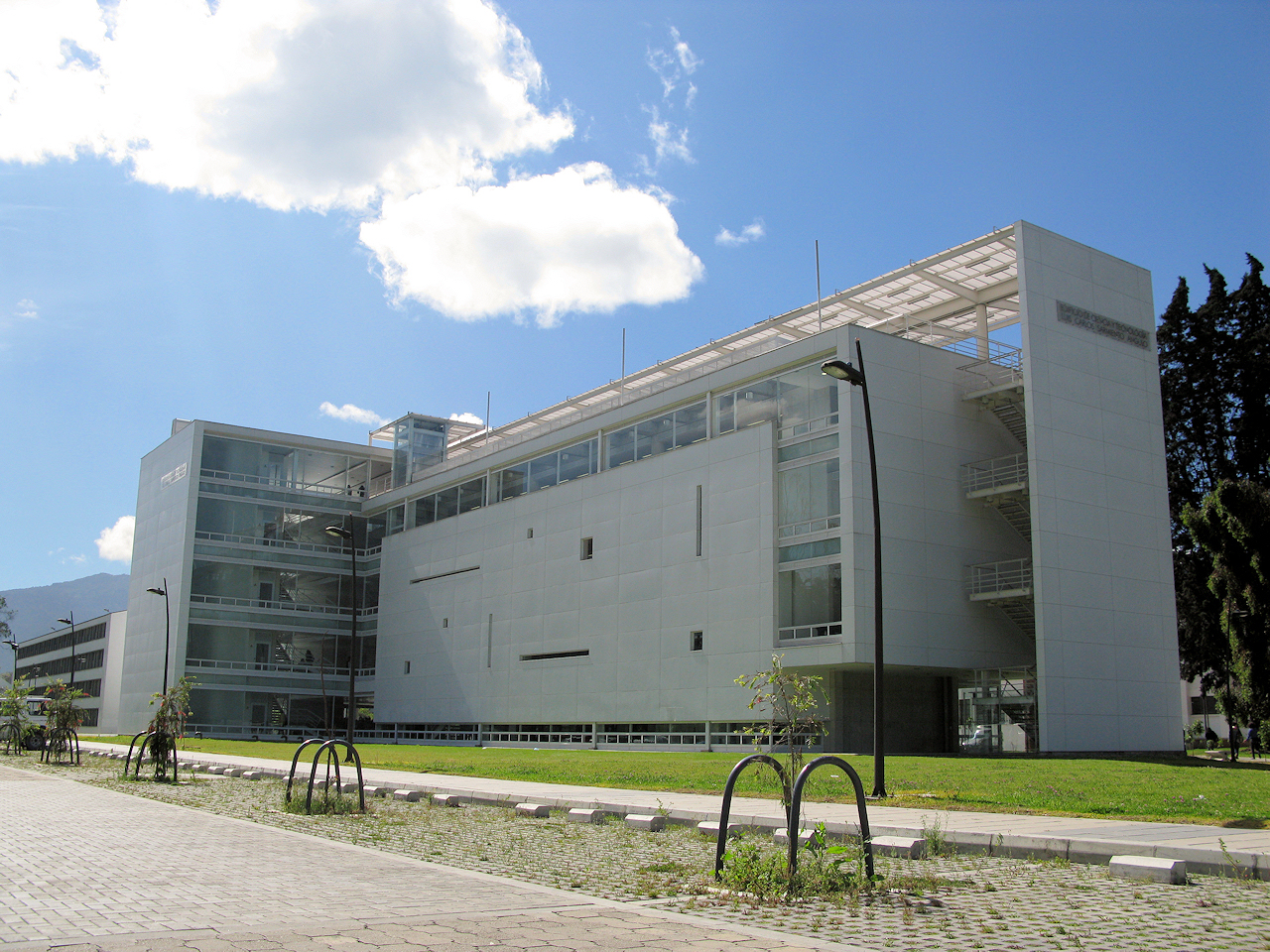
Luis Carlos Sarmiento Building of Science and Technology at the National University of Colombia

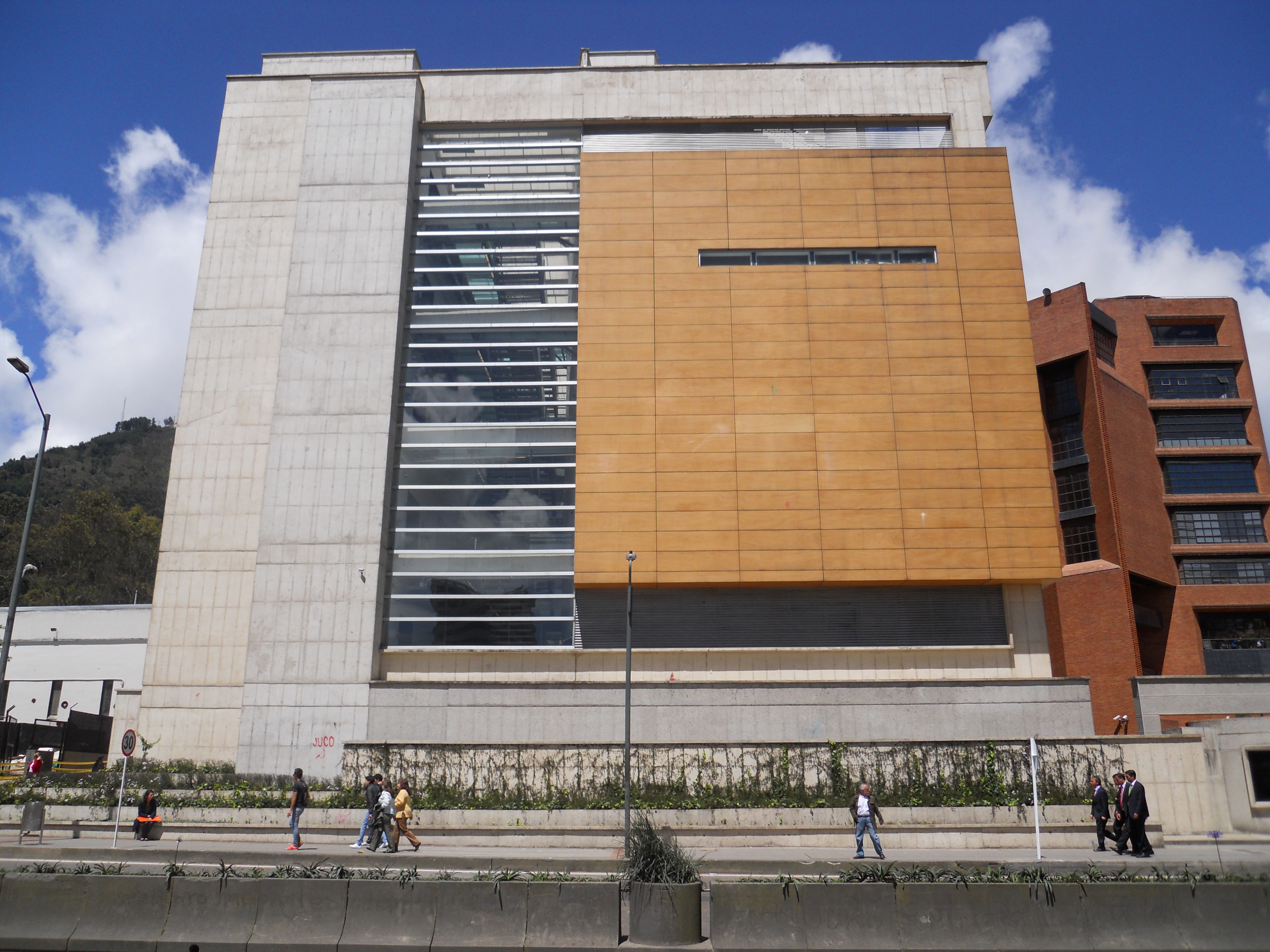
Centro Ático at Pontifical Xavierian University

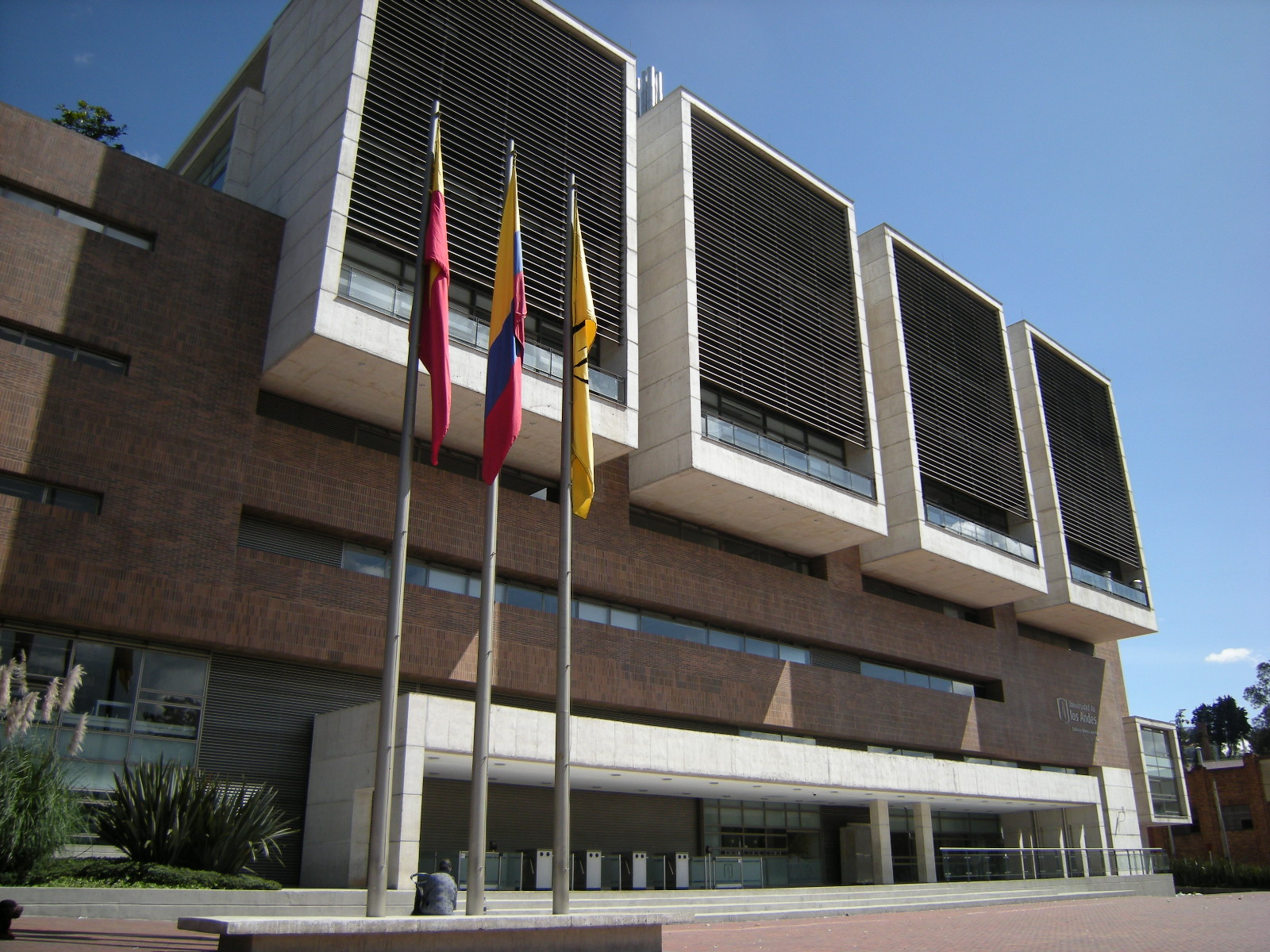
Mario Laserna Building at the University of the Andes

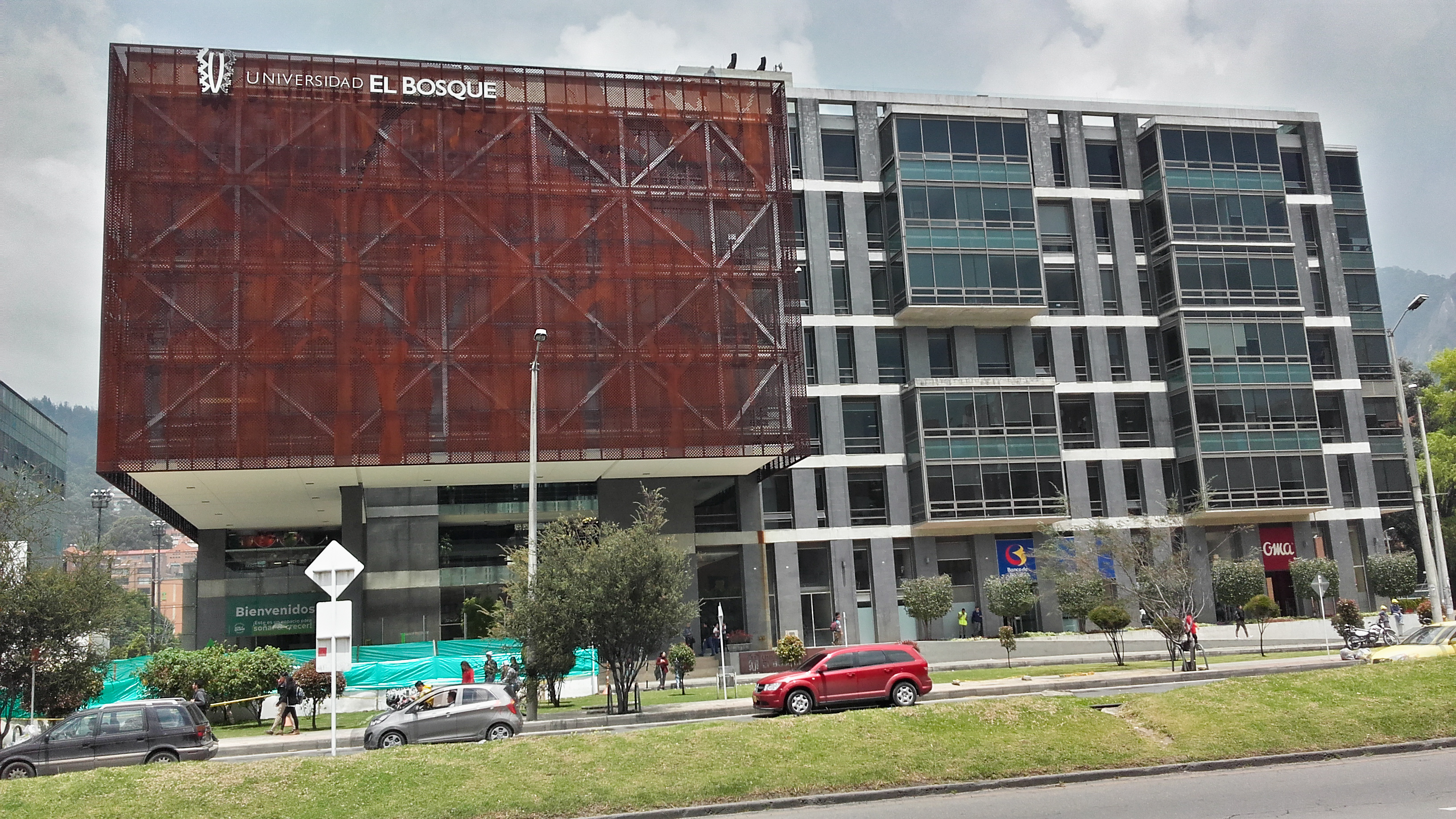
Liberators Building at El Bosque University

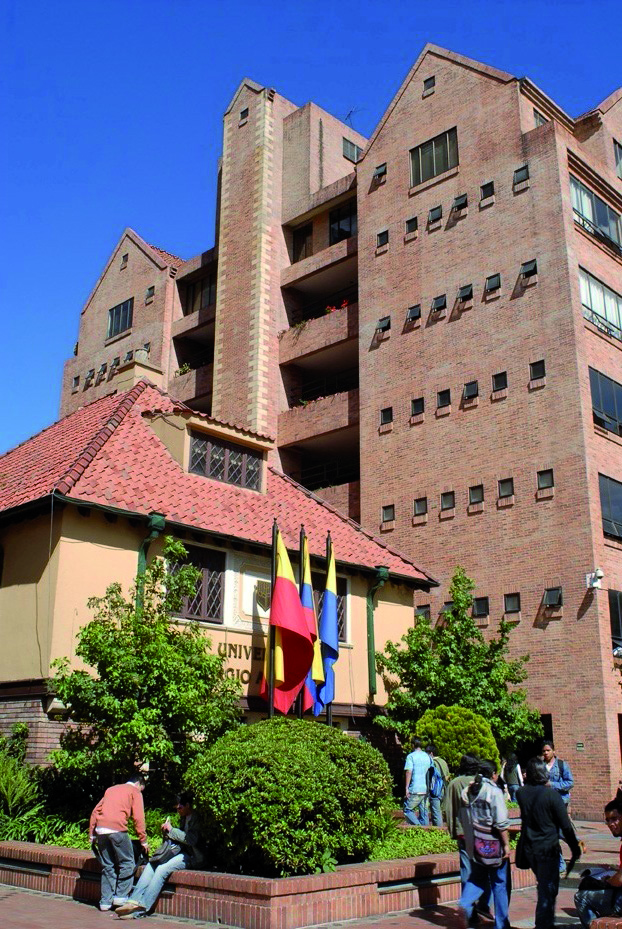
Sergio Arboleda University

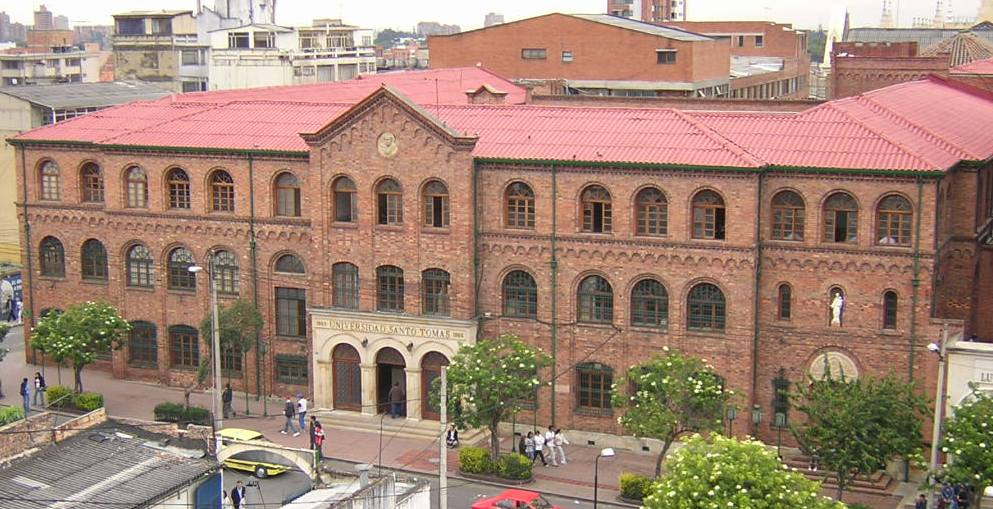
Main Cloister at Saint Thomas Aquinas University

== Culture ==
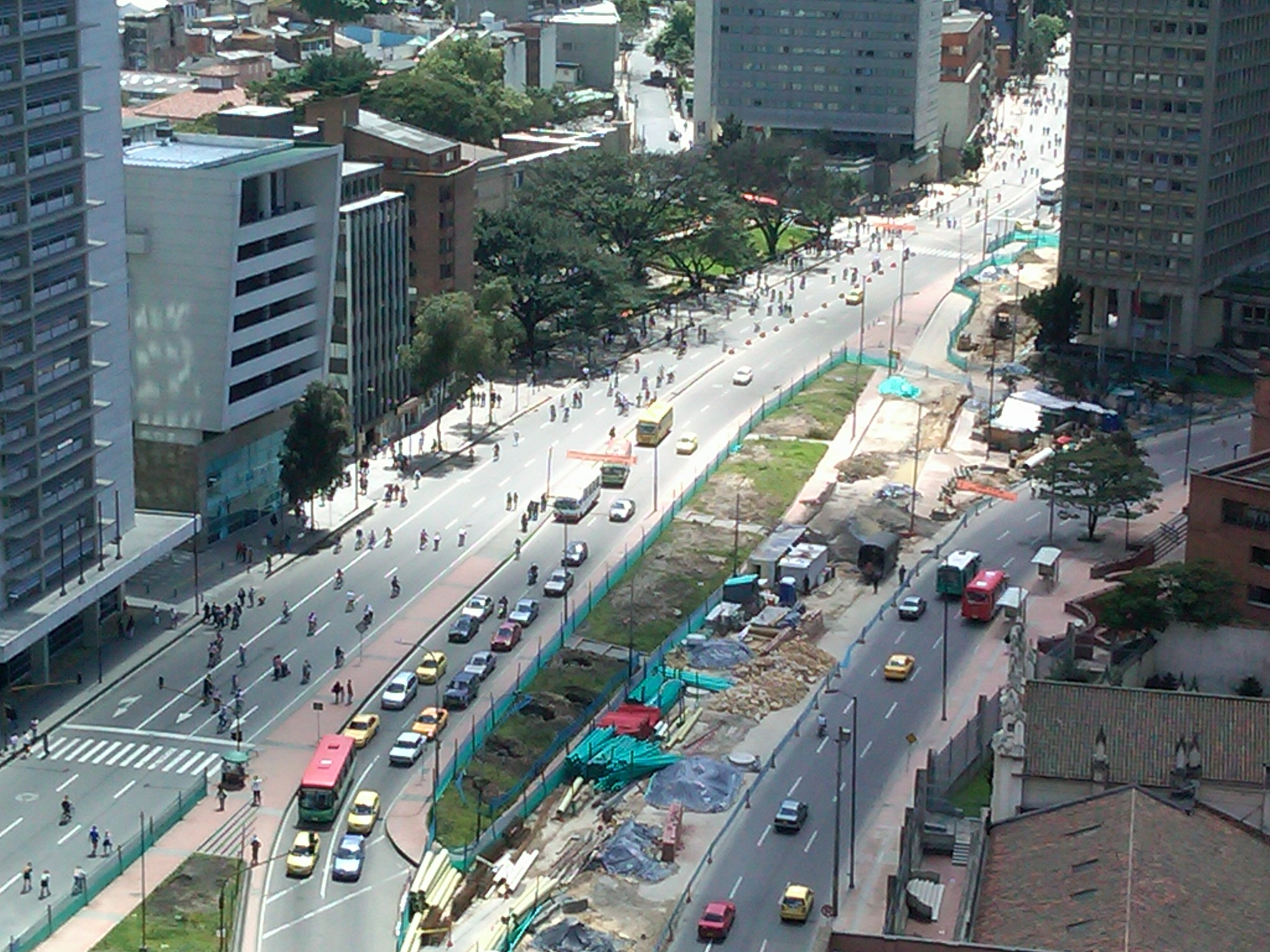
Ciclovía in Bogotá

Bogotá has many cultural venues including 58 museums, 62 art galleries, 150 libraries (of different types), 45 stage theaters, 75 sports and attraction parks, and over 150 national monuments. Many of these are renowned globally such as: BibloRed, Bogotá's Public Libraries Network, the Luis Ángel Arango Library, the most important in the region which receives well over 6 million visitors a year; the Colombian National Museum, one of the oldest in the Americas, dating back to 1823; the Ibero-American Theater Festival, largest of its kind in the world, receives 2 million attendees enjoying over 450 performances across theaters and off the street; the Bogotá Philharmonic is the most important symphony orchestra in Colombia, with over 100 musicians and 140 performances a year. The city has been a member of the UNESCO Creative Cities Network in the category of music since March 2012. In 2007, Bogotá was named World Book Capital by UNESCO.

The Cristóbal Colón Theater, the country's oldest Opera House, opened in 1892. It is home to the National Symphony Association's major act, the National Symphony Orchestra of Colombia.

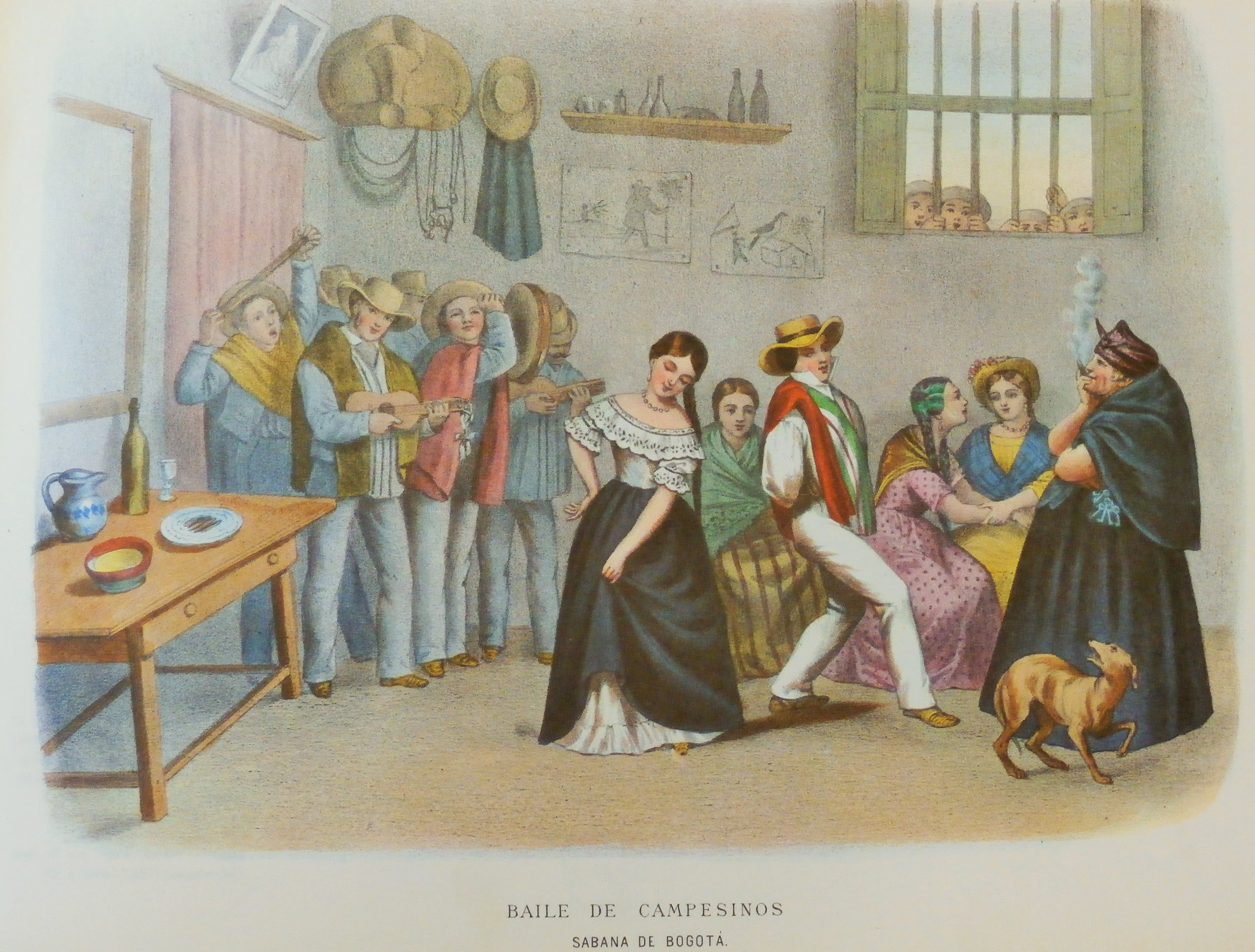
Dance of peasants of Bogotá savanna, 1878, by Ramón Torres Méndez. Museo de la Independencia Casa del Florero.

Rock al Parque or Rock at the Park is an open air rock music festival. Recurring annually, it gathers over 320,000 music fans who can enjoy over 60 band performances for free during three days a year. The series have been so successful during its 15 years of operation that the city has replicated the initiative for other music genres, resulting in other recent festivals like Salsa at the Park, Hip Hop at the Park, Ballet at the Park, Opera at the Park, and Jazz at the Park.

Kids' Choice Awards Colombia, are the awards given in the city by Nickelodeon and the first ceremony was given in 2014 by the singer Maluma and in Corferias the ceremony has been the home of shows given by artists like Austin Mahone, Carlos Peña, Don Tetto and Riva among others.

Bogotá has worked in recent years to position itself as leader in cultural offerings in South America, and it is increasingly being recognized worldwide as a hub in the region for the development of the arts. In 2007, Bogotá was awarded the title of Cultural Capital of Ibero-America by the UCCI (Union of Ibero-American Capital Cities), and it became the only city to have received the recognition twice, after being awarded for the first time in 1991.

=== Cultural history ===
Bogotá gave the Spanish-speaking world José Asunción Silva (1865–1896), Modernism pioneer. His poetic work in the novel De sobremesa has a place in outstanding American literature. Rafael Pombo (1833–1912) was an American romanticism poet who left a collection of fables essential part of children imagination and Colombian tradition.

=== Architecture ===
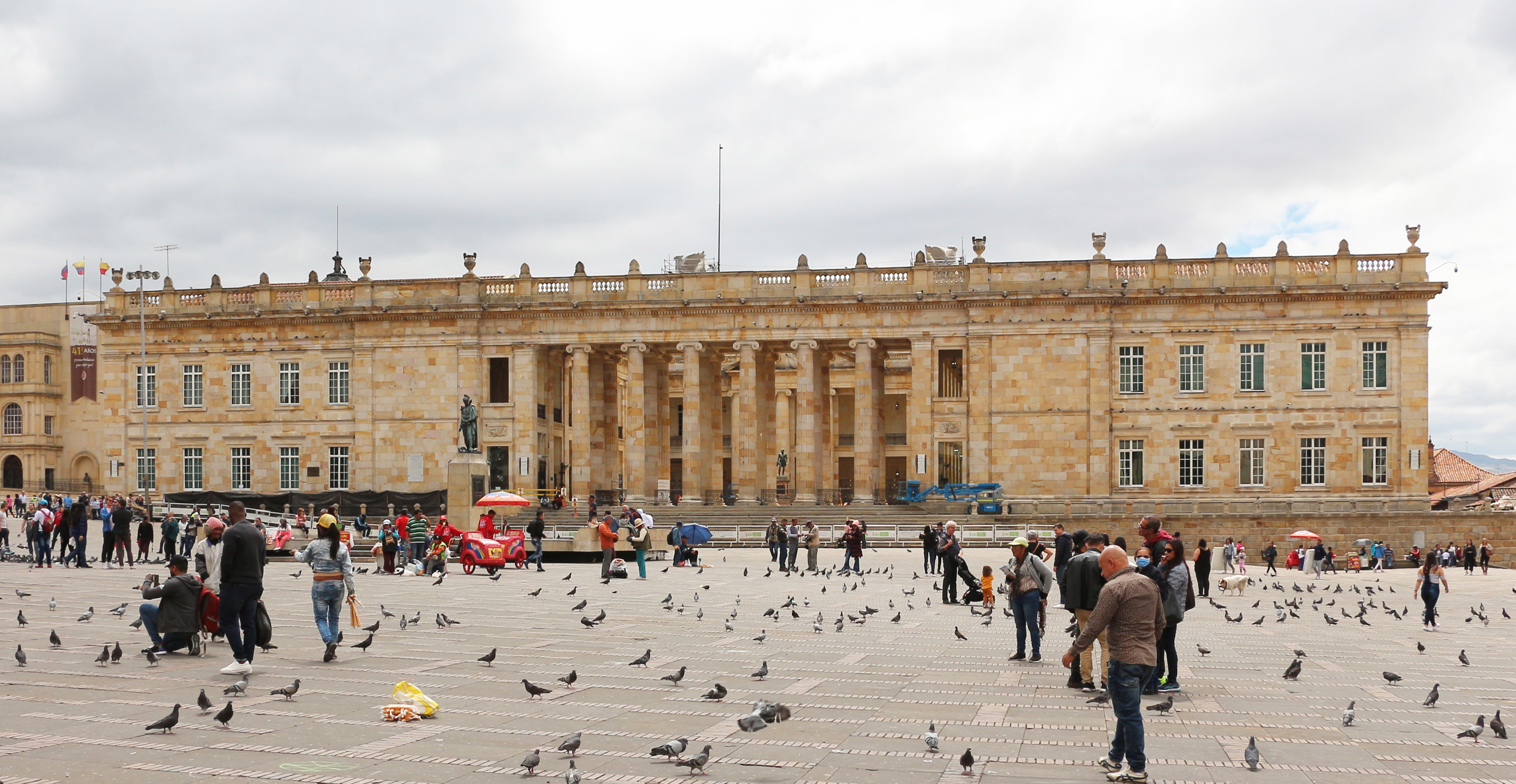
National Capitol of Colombia in Bolivar Square.

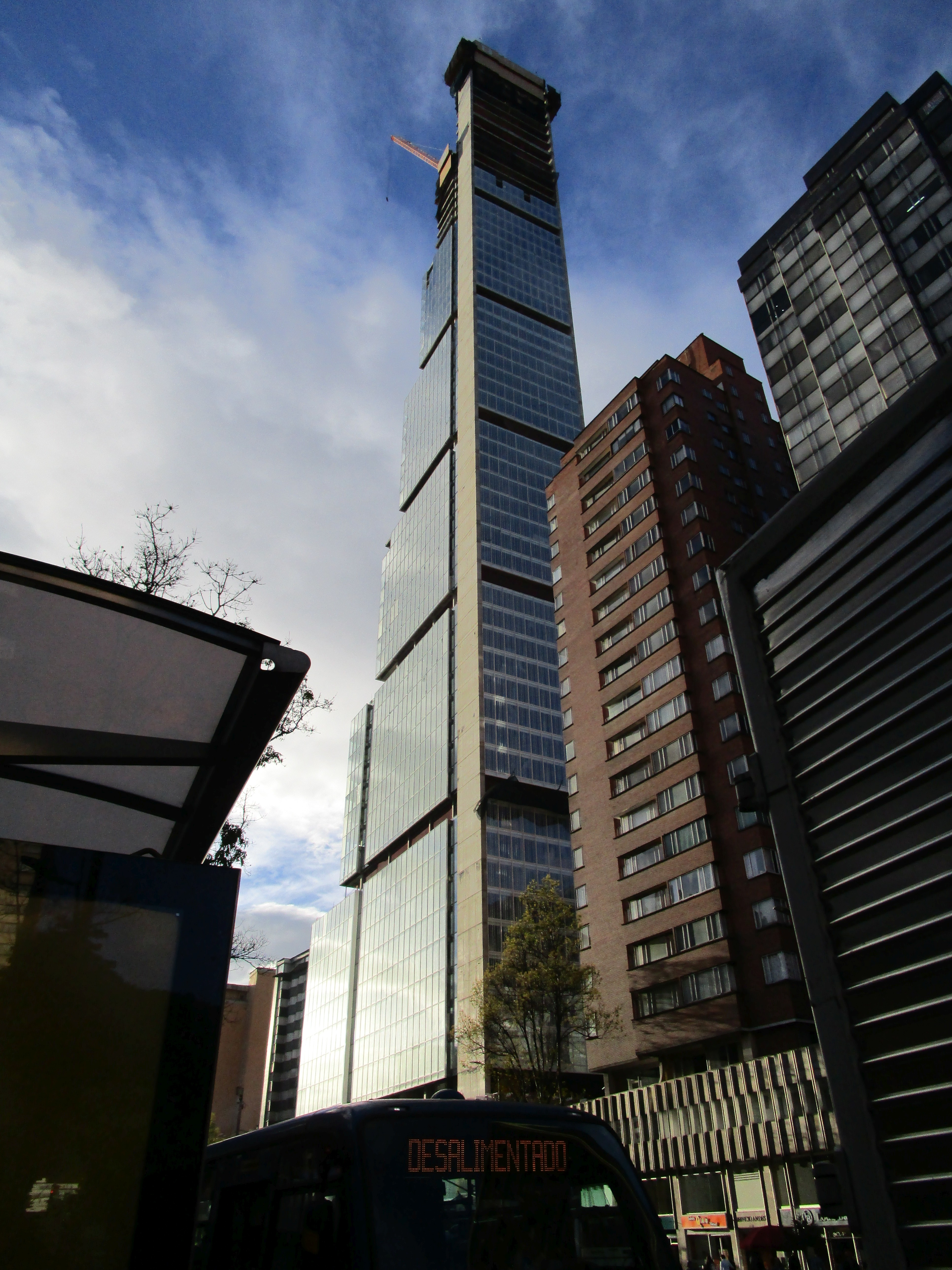
BD Bacatá, under construction, will be the city's tallest building.

The urban morphology and typology of colonial buildings in Bogotá have been maintained since the late nineteenth century, long after the independence of Colombia (1810). This persistence of the colonial setting is still visible, particularly in La Candelaria, the historical center of Bogotá. Also kept up are the colonial houses of two stories, with courtyards, gabled roofs, ceramic tiles and balconies. In some cases, these balconies were enclosed with glass windows during the Republican period, a distinguishing feature of the architecture of the sector (for example, the House of Rafael Pombo).

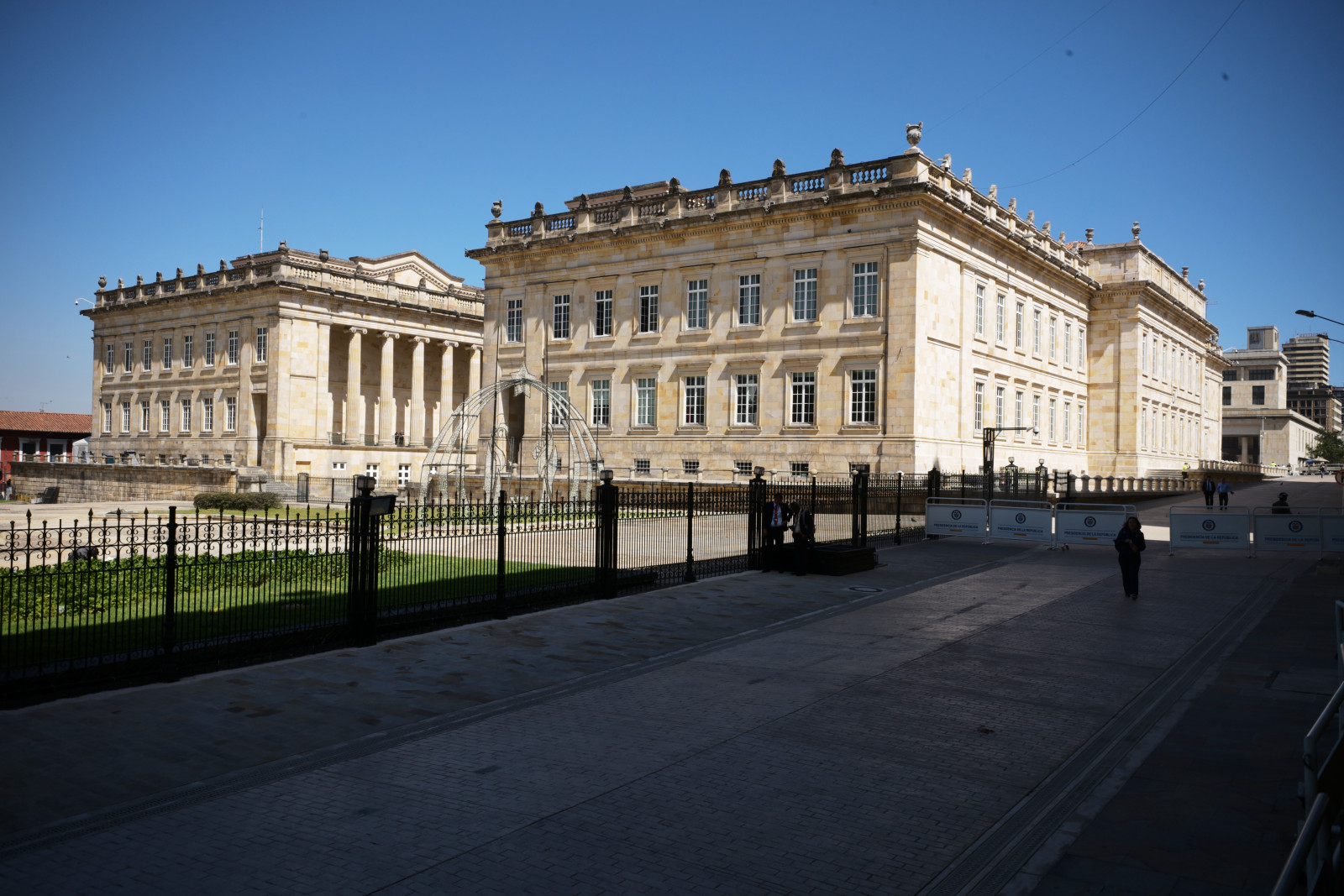
Rear view of the National Capitol, being the largest neoclassical building in the country

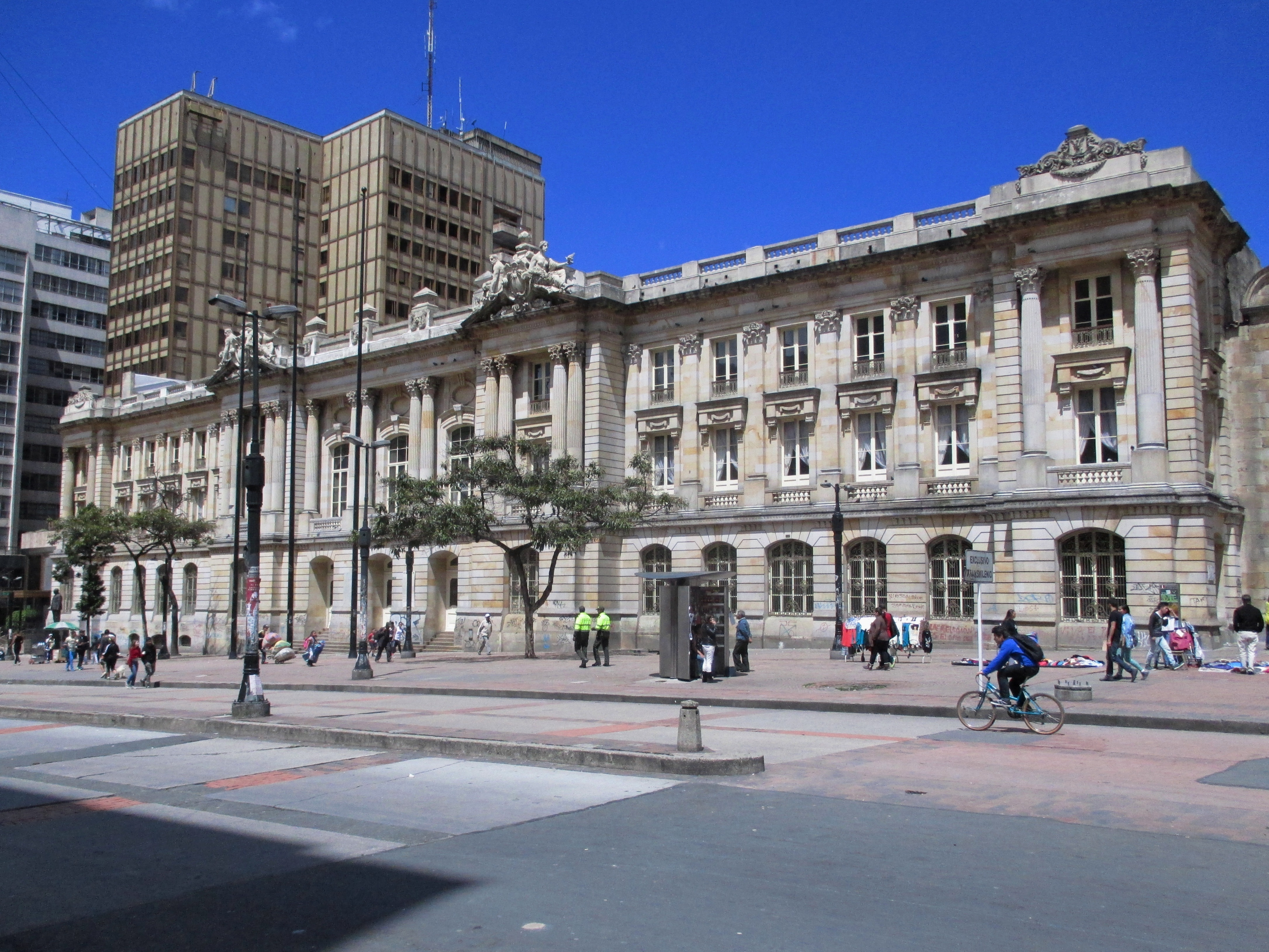
Palace of San Francisco.

"Republican Architecture" was the style that prevailed between 1830 and 1930. Although there were attempts to consolidate a modern architectural language, the only examples seen are University City and White City at the National University of Colombia (constructed 1936–39). This work was developed by German architect Leopold Rother, although architects of rationalist trends participated in the design of campus buildings. There are also architecture trends such as art deco, expressionism and organic architecture. This last trend was typified by Bogotan architects in the second half of the twentieth century such as Rogelio Salmona.

In 2015 BD Bacatá was inaugurated, surpassing the Colpatria Tower to become the tallest building of the city and of Colombia. The building its expected to be the beginning of the city's downtown renovation.

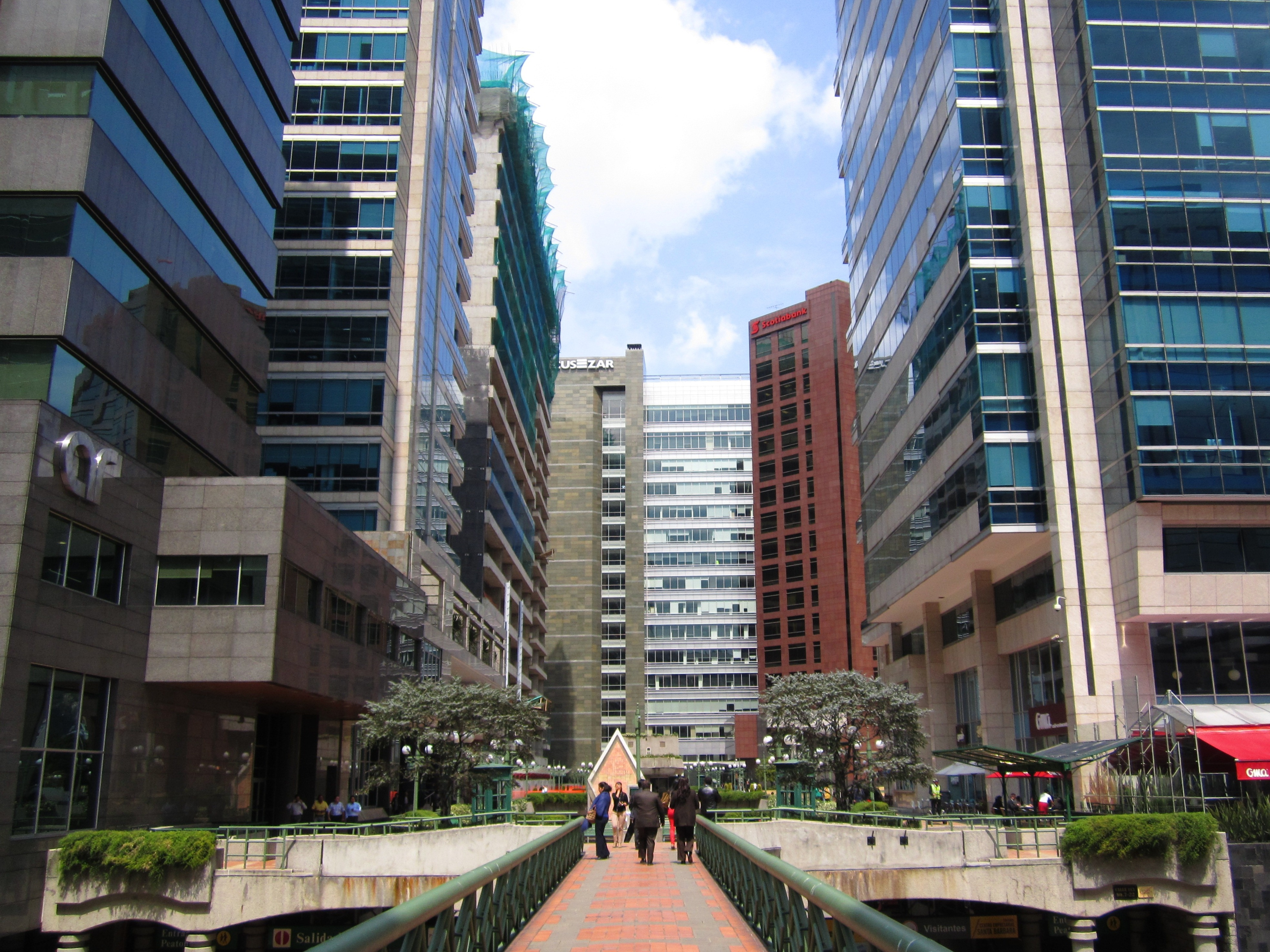
Santa Barbara business district

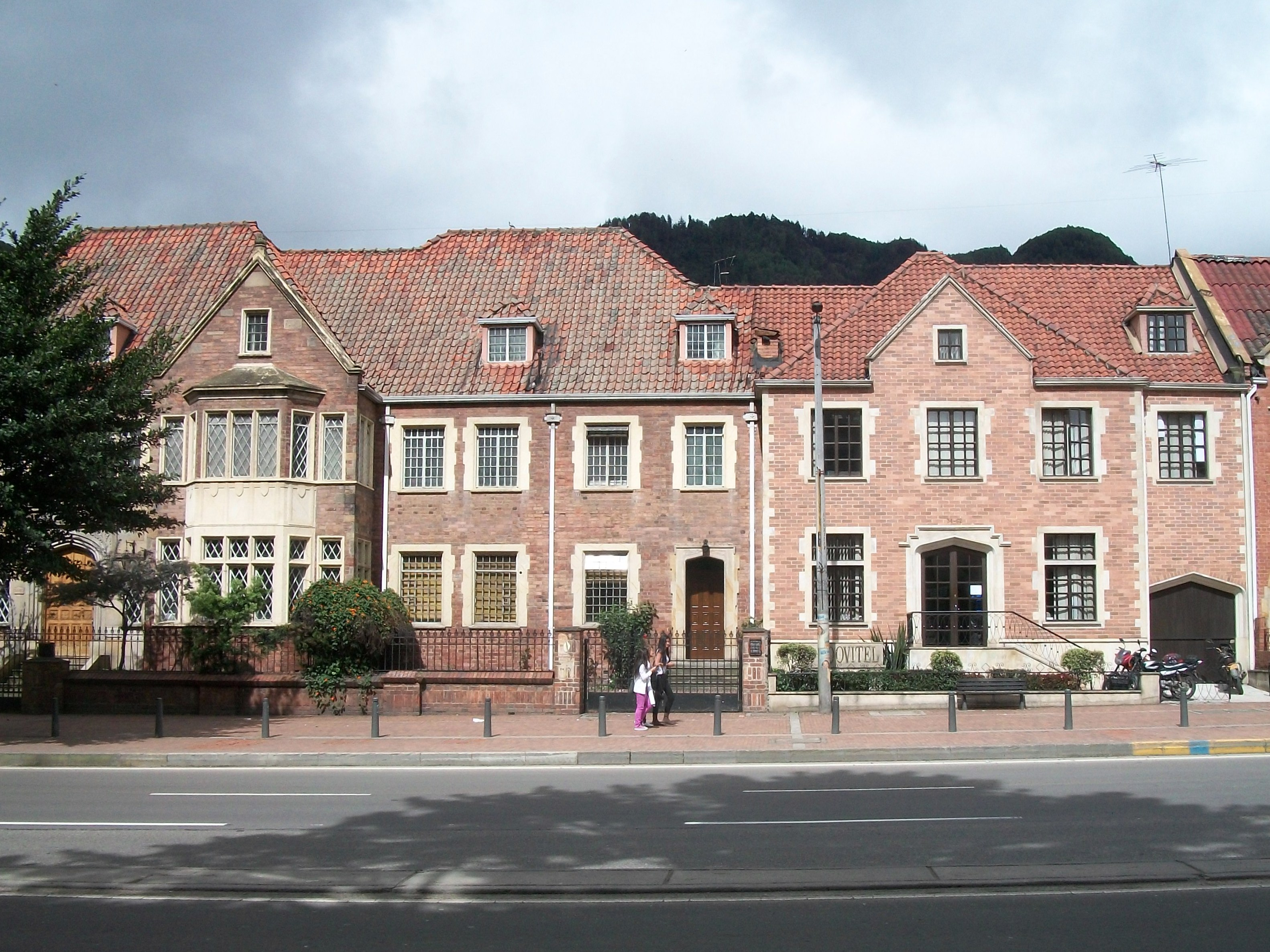
Victorian architecture in Teusaquillo

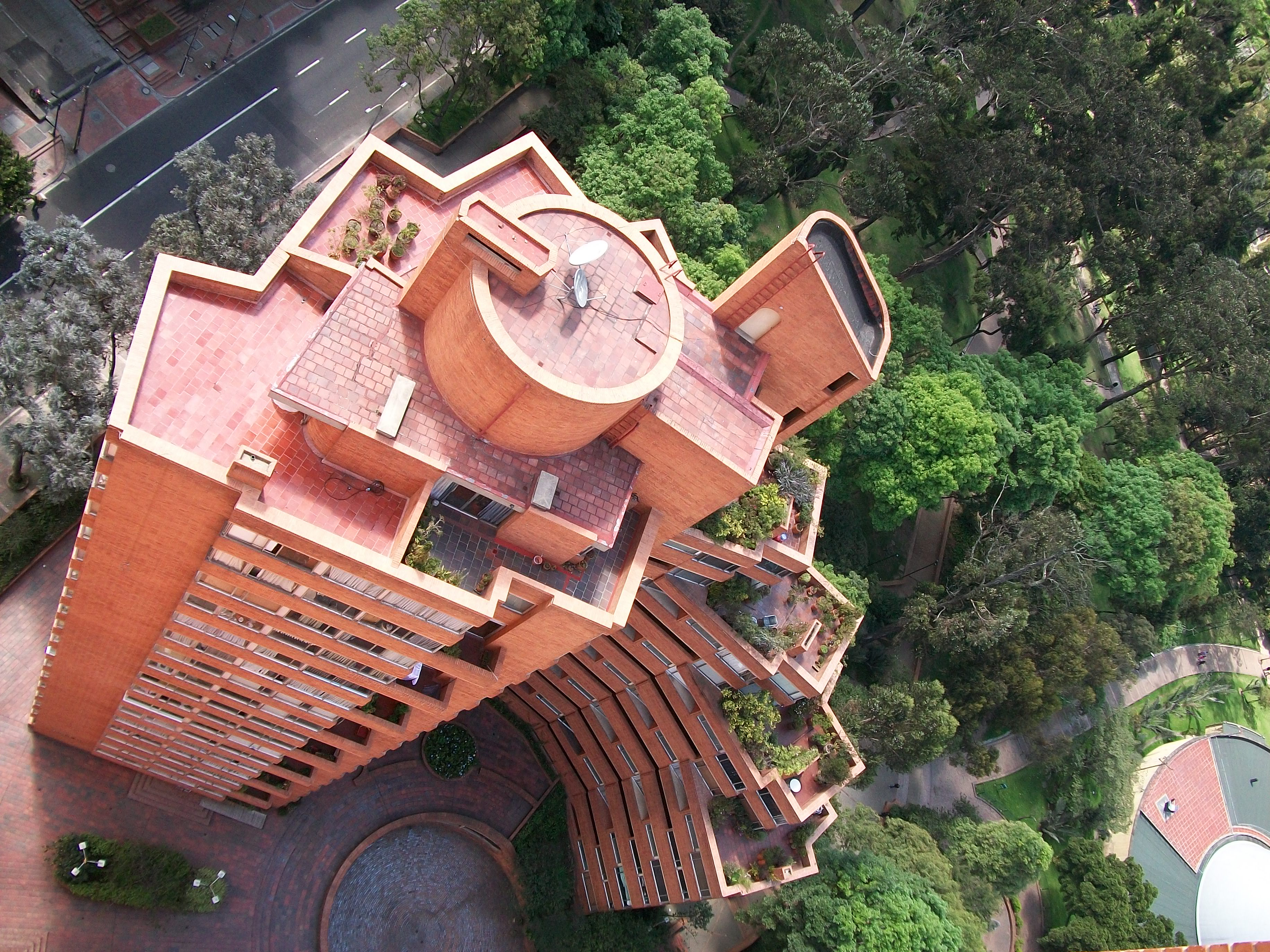
Torres del Parque

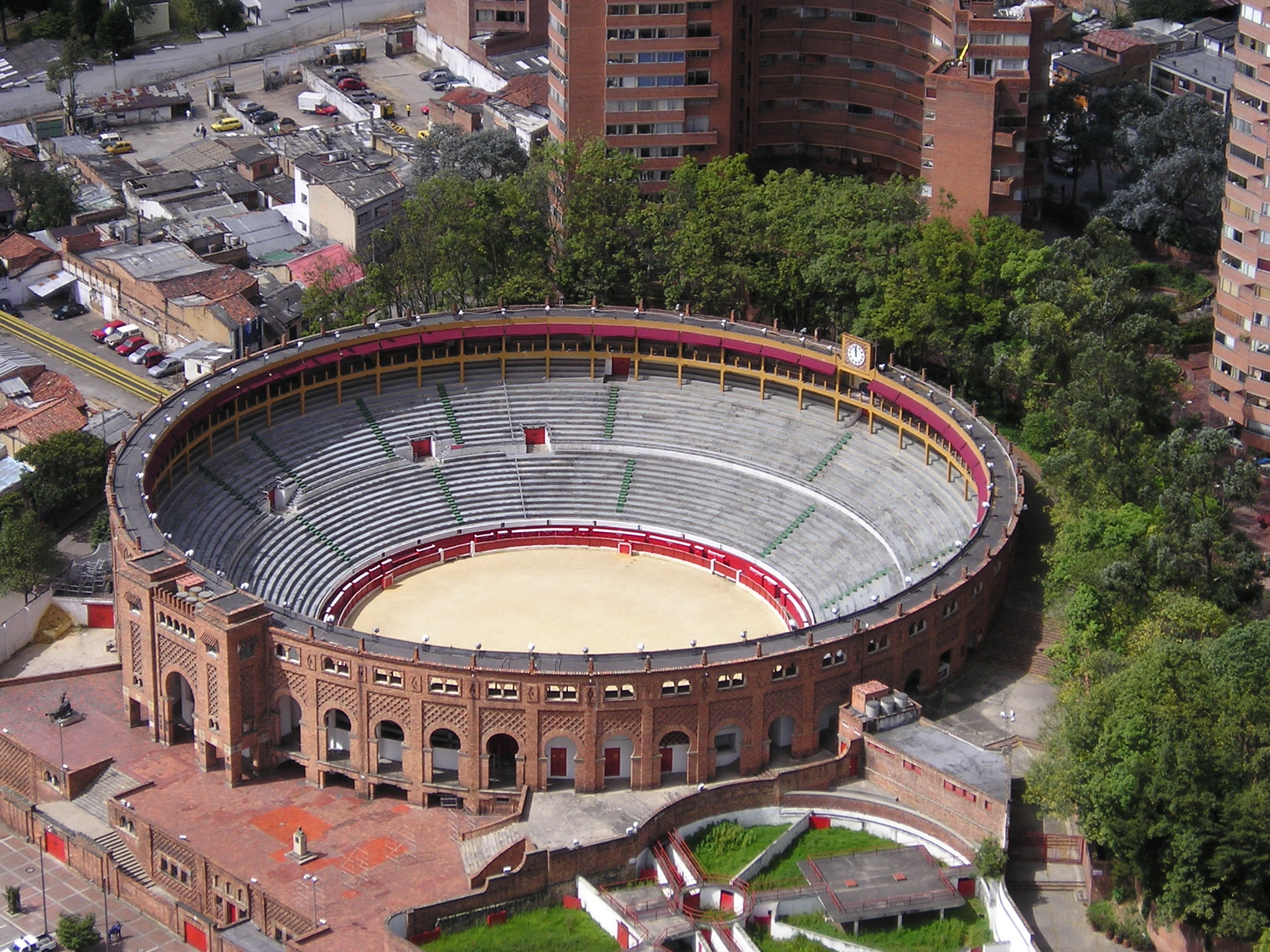
Santa Maria bullring

=== Libraries and archives ===
In 2007, Bogotá was named World Book Capital by UNESCO. Bogotá is the first Latin American city to receive this recognition, and the second one in the Americas after Montreal. It stood out in programs, the library network and the presence of organizations that, in a coordinated manner, are working to promote books and reading in the city. Several specific initiatives for the World Book Capital program have been undertaken with the commitment of groups, both public and private, engaged in the book sector.

The city is home to the Biblored, a network which administers 146 small and four large public libraries (Biblioteca Virgilio Barco, Biblioteca El Tintal, Biblioteca El Tunal and Biblioteca Julio Mario Santodomingo). It also has six branches of the Library Network of the Family Compensation Fund Colsubsidio and libraries and documentation centers attached to institutions like the Museo Nacional de Colombia (specializing in old books, catalogs and art), Bogotá Museum of Modern Art, the Alliance Française, and the Centro Colombo Americano.

Another set of libraries are the new collaborative initiatives between the state, city and international agencies. Examples are the Cultural Center Gabriel García Marquez, custom designed by the Fondo de Cultura Economica in Mexico, and the Spanish Cultural Center, which will begin construction with public funds and of the Spanish government in downtown Bogotá.

The National Library of Colombia (1777), a dependence of the Ministry of Culture and the Biblioteca Luis Angel Arango (1958), a dependence of the Bank of the Republic are the two largest public libraries in the city. The first is the repository of more than two million volumes, with an important collection of ancient books. The latter has almost two million volumes, and with 45,000 m^{2} (480,000 sq ft) in size, it hosts 10,000 visitors a day; the Library Alfonso Palacio Rudas is also a dependence of the Bank of the Republic, and is located at the north of the city, with about 50,000 volumes. Other large public libraries are the Library of Congress in Colombia (with 100,000 volumes), of the Instituto Caro y Cuervo (with nearly 200,000 volumes, the largest Latin American library in Philology and Linguistics), the Library of the Academy of History, the Library of the Academy of Language, the Library of the Colombian Institute of Anthropology and History ICANH, and many university libraries.

Bogotá is home to historical records housed in the General National Archive, a collection of about 60 million documents, one of the largest repositories of primary historical sources in Latin America. Bogotá is also home to the Musical Archive of the Cathedral of Bogotá (with thousands of books and choral song-colonial period), the Archdiocesan Archive, the Archive of the Conciliar Seminary of Bogotá, the Archive History National University of Colombia and the Archive of the Mint in Bogotá, under the Bank of the Republic.

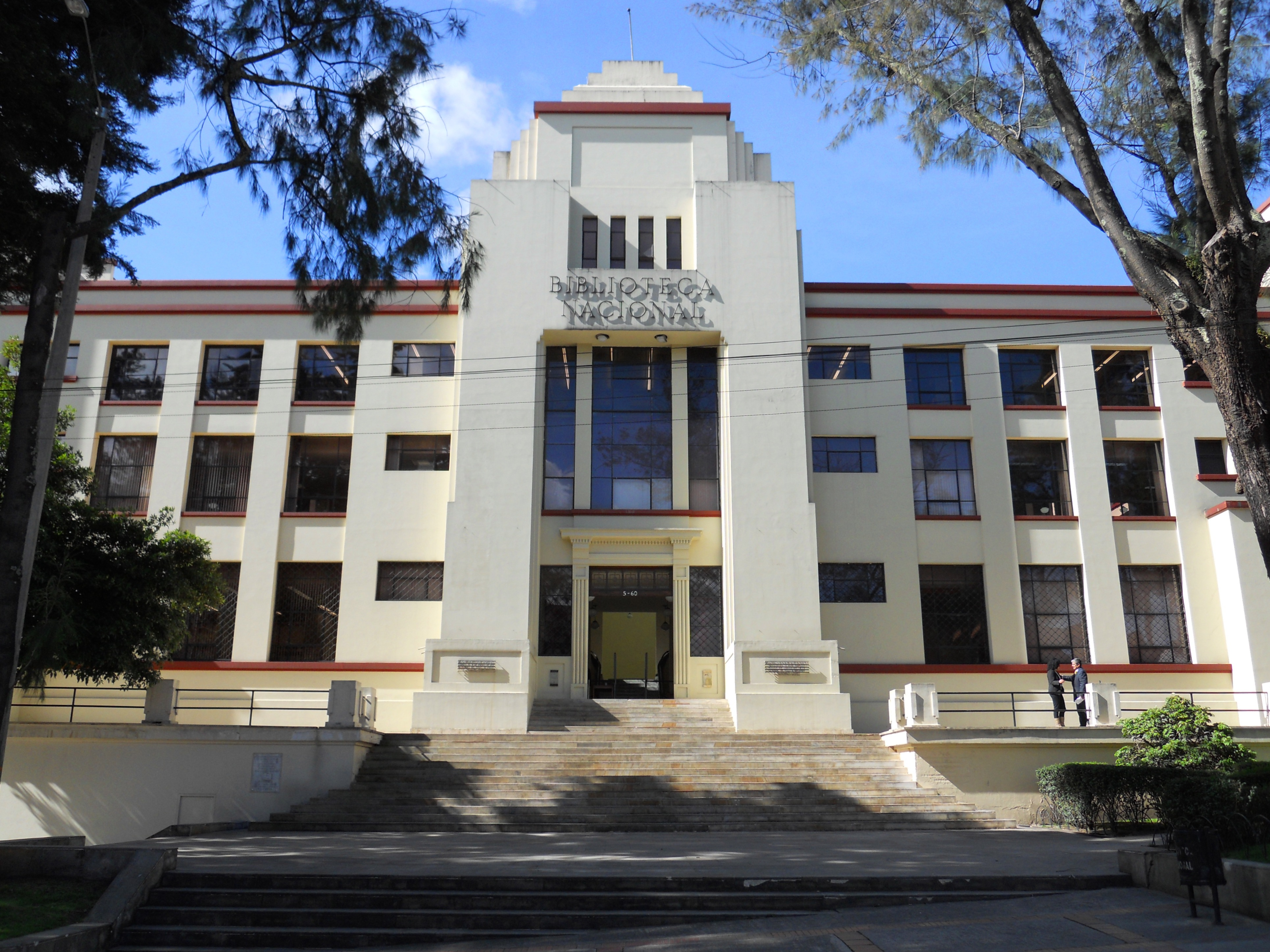
National Library of Colombia

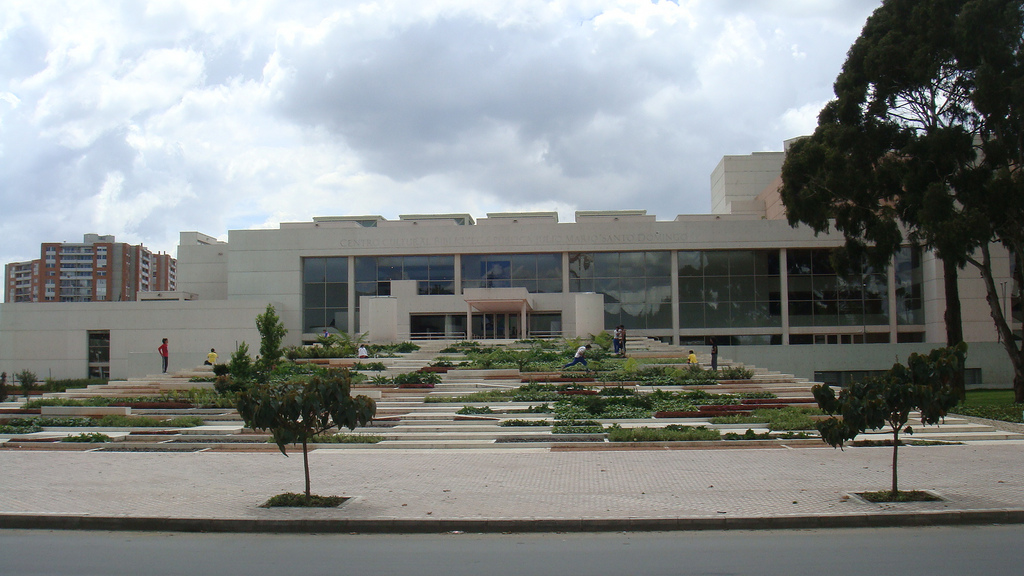
Julio Mario Santo Domingo Public Library

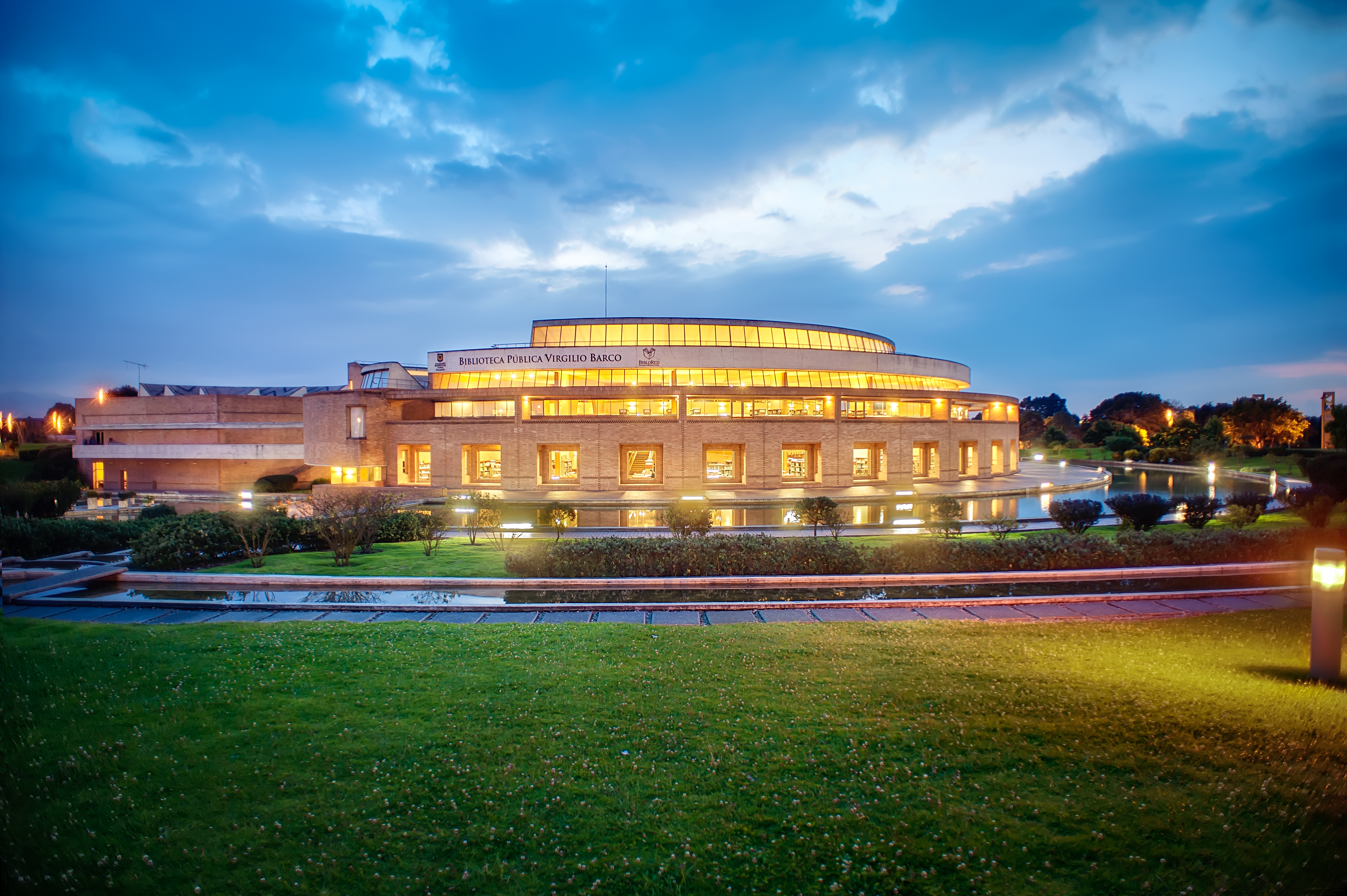
Virgilio Barco Public Library

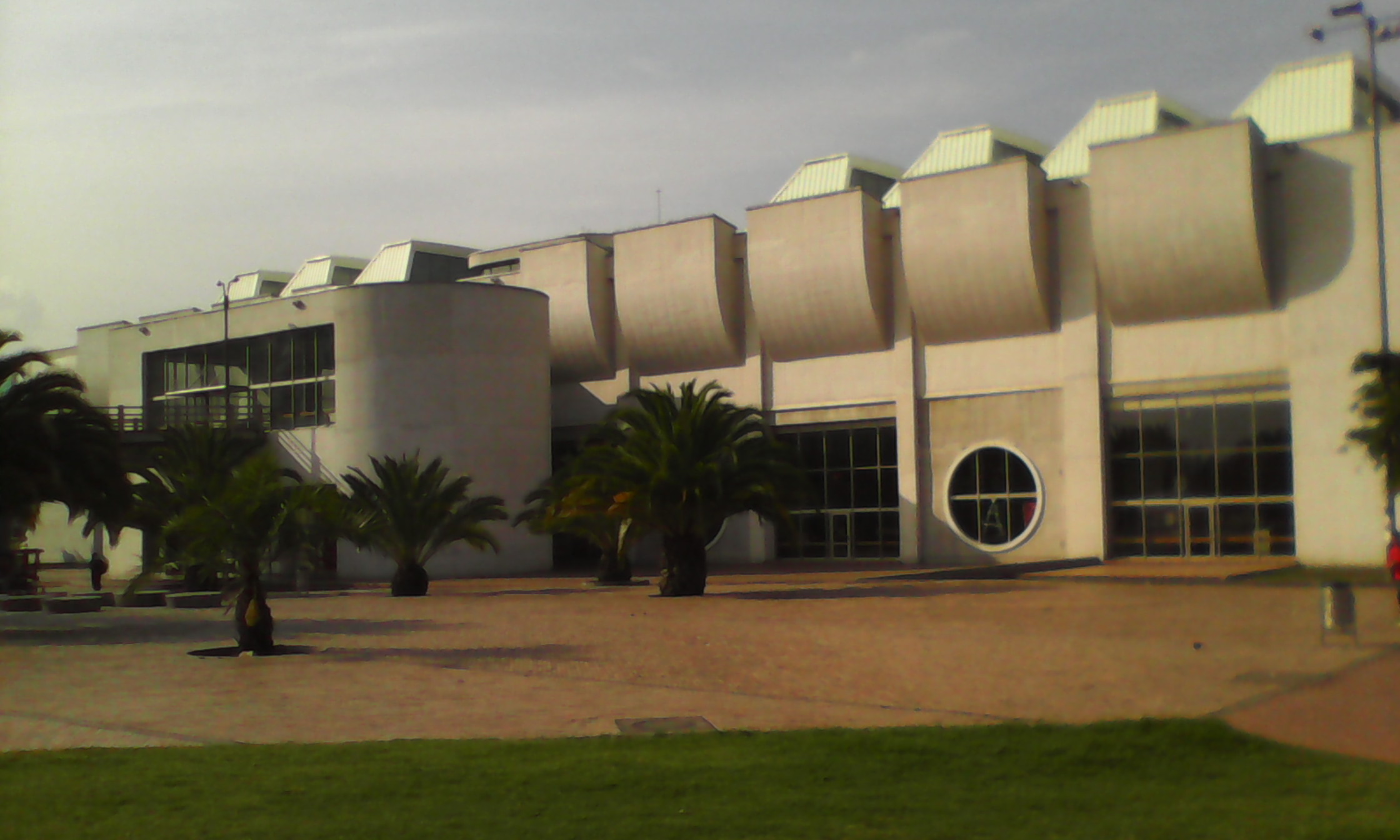
El Tintal Public Library

=== Museums and galleries ===
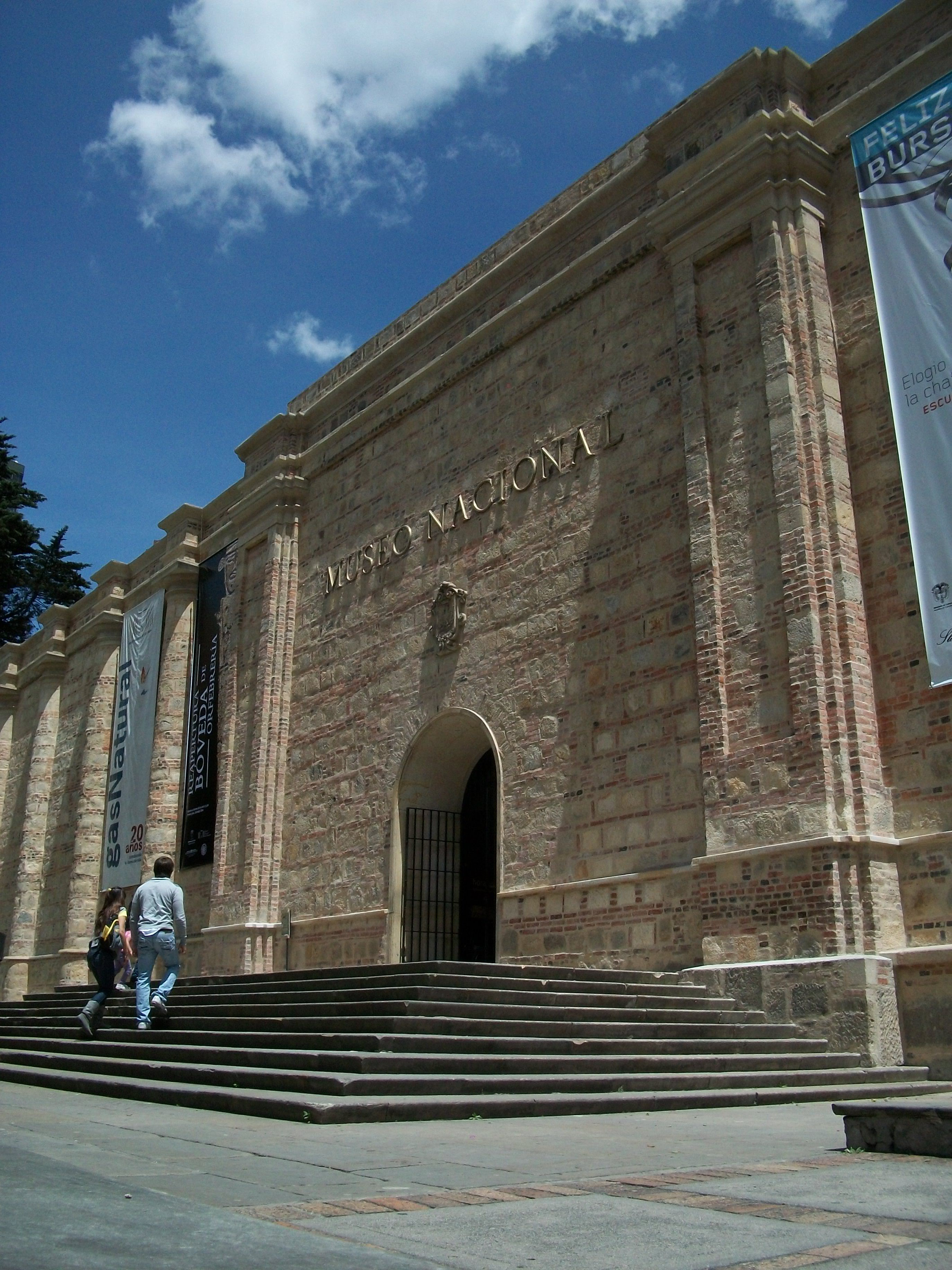
Colombian National Museum

As of 2009, the city had 58 museums and 62 art galleries. The National Museum of Colombia has acquisitions divided into four collections: art, history, archeology and ethnography. The Gold Museum, with 35,000 pieces of tumbaga gold, along with 30,000 objects in ceramic, stone and textiles, represents the largest collection of pre-Columbian gold in the world.

The Museo Botero has 123 works of Fernando Botero and 87 works by international artists. The Bogotá Museum of Modern Art has a collection of graphic arts, industrial design and photography. The Museum of Colonial Art is home to an important collection of colonial art from Colombia. Fundación Gilberto Alzate Avendaño hosts activities related to the performing arts and shows temporary exhibits of art in its halls and galleries.

Among the scientific museums are the Archeological Museum – Casa del Marqués de San Jorge, which has about 30 thousand pieces of pre-Columbian art, Instituto de Ciencias Naturales (UN), one of the four largest museums of natural sciences in Latin America, and the Geological Museum, which has a collection specializing in Geology and Paleontology.

Bogotá has historical museums like the Jorge Eliecer Gaitan Museum, the Museum of Independence (Museo de la Independencia), the Quinta de Bolívar and the Casa Museo Francisco José de Caldas, as well as the headquarters of Maloka and the Children's Museum of Bogotá. New museums include the Art Deco and the Museum of Bogotá.

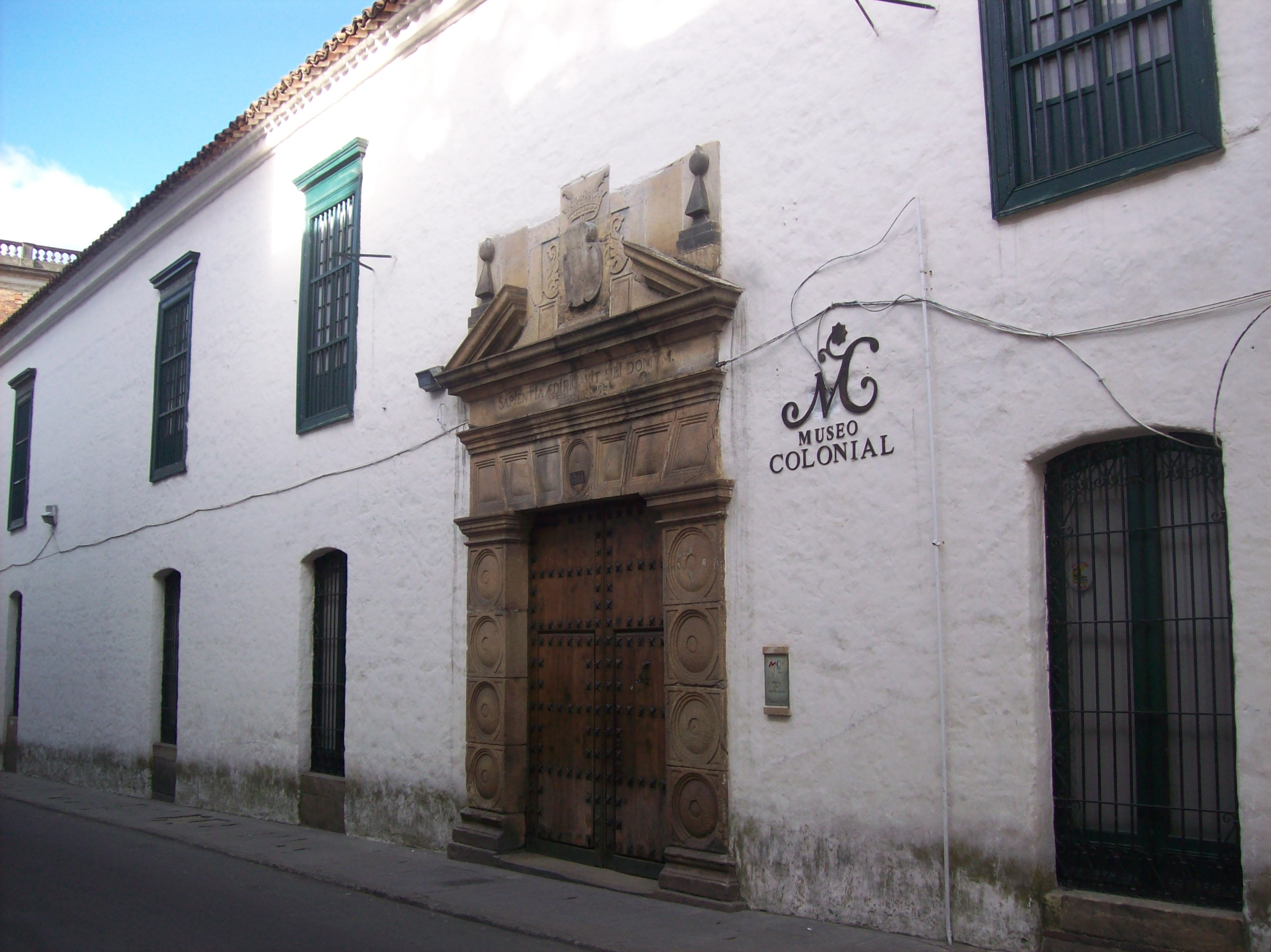
Colonial Art Museum of Bogotá

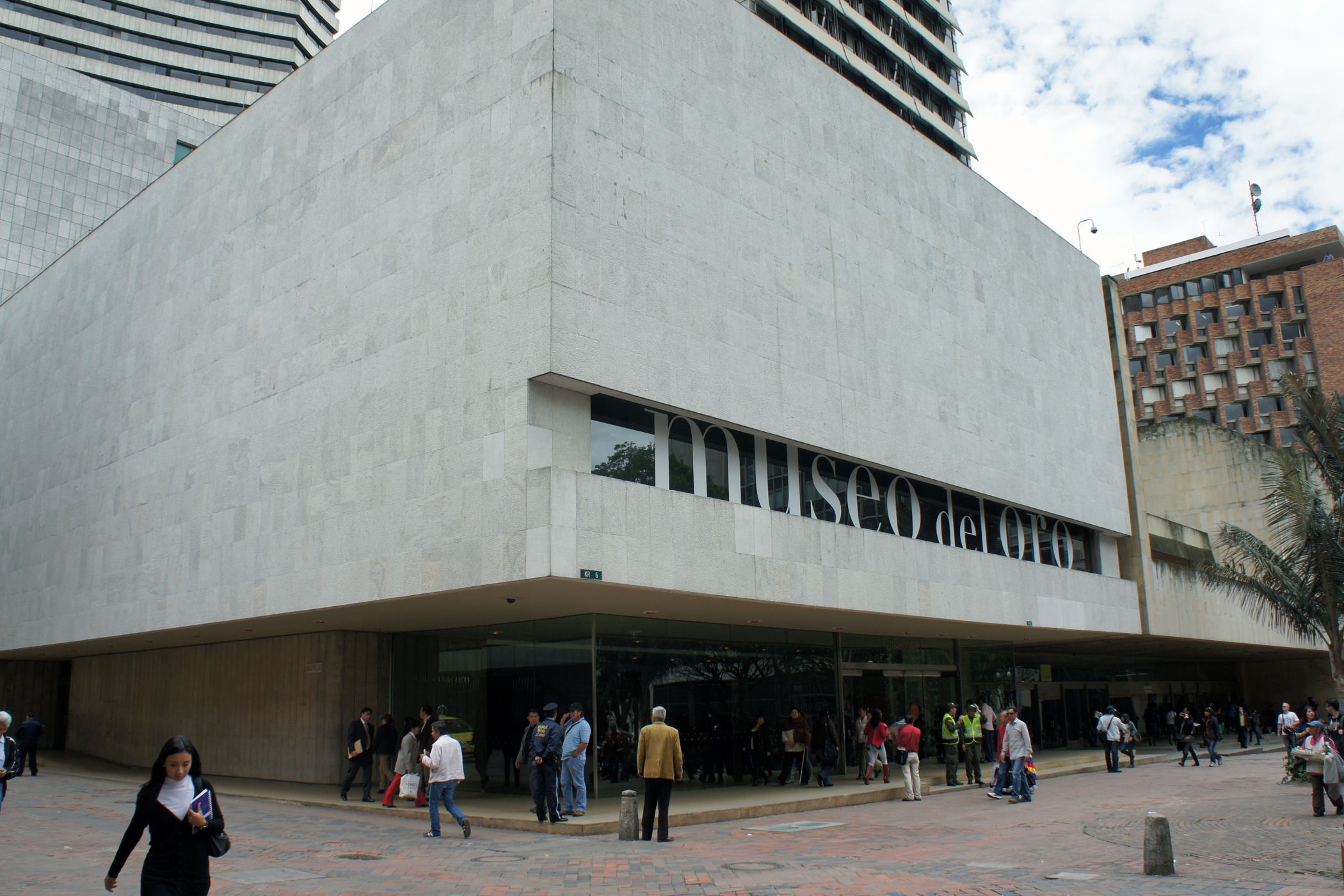
Gold Museum of Bogotá

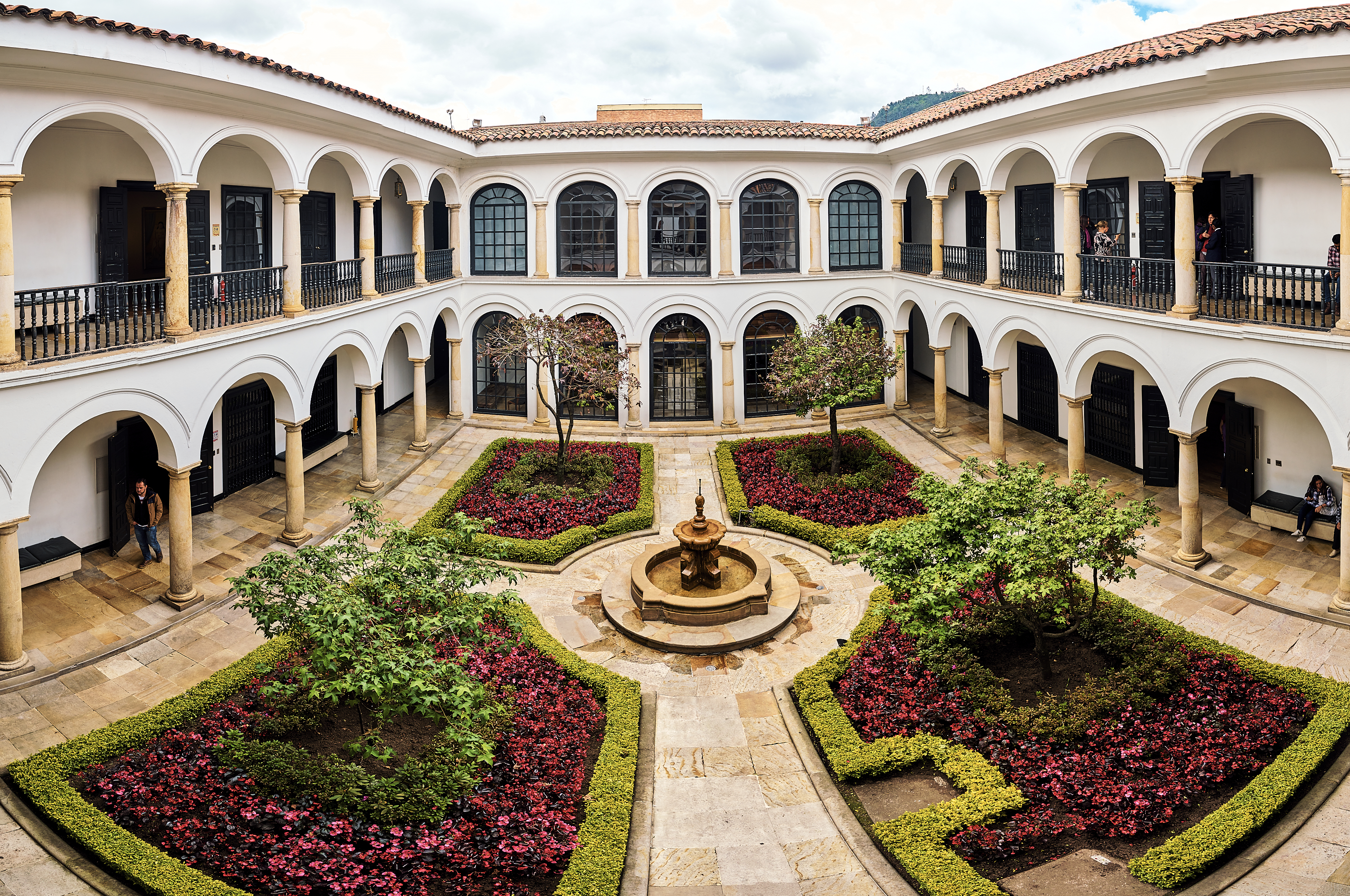
Botero Museum

=== Theater and arts ===
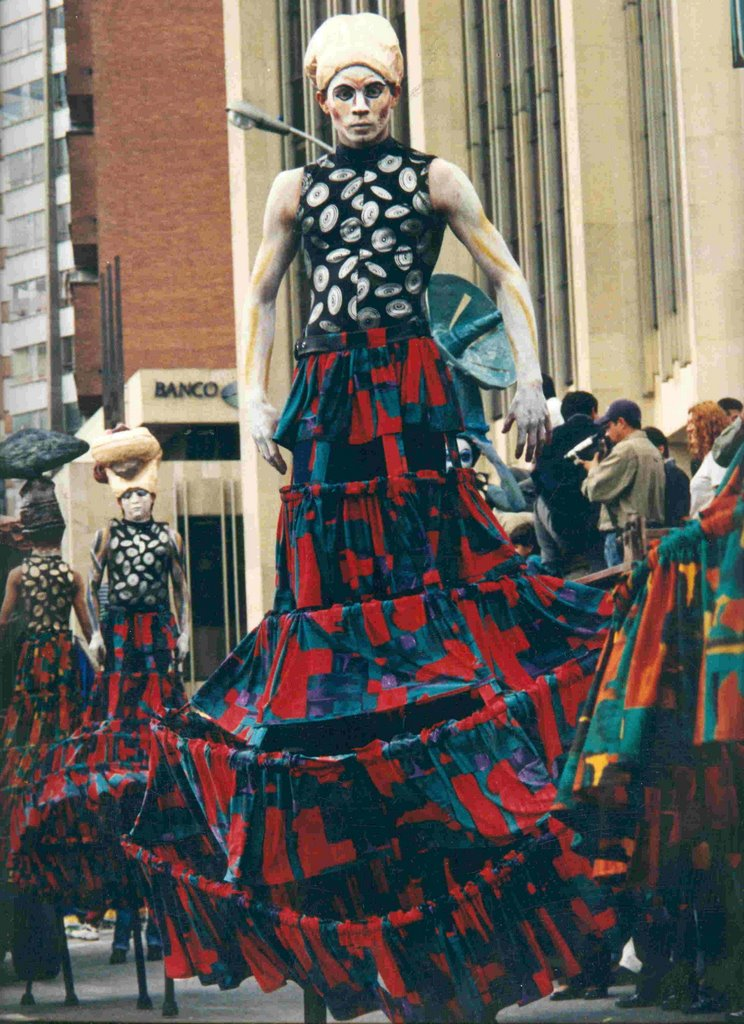
Ibero-American Theater Festival

Teatro de Cristóbal Colón (Christopher Columbus Theater)

Besides the Ibero-American Theater Festival, the largest theater festival in the world, the city has forty-five theaters; the principal ones are the Colon Theater, the newly built Teatro Mayor Julio Mario Santo Domingo, the National Theater with its two venues, the traditional TPB Hall, the Theater of La Candelaria, the Camarin del Carmen (over 400 years old, formerly a convent), the Colsubsidio, and a symbol of the city, the renovated Teatro Jorge Eliécer Gaitán, León de Greiff Auditorium (home of the Bogotá Philharmonic Orchestra), and the Open Air Theater "La Media Torta", where musical events are also held.

The Ibero-American Theater Festival, is not the only acclaimed festival. There are many other regional and local theater festivals that are celebrated and maintain the city active year-round. Amongst these is the "Alternative Theater Festival".

Bogotá has its own film festival, the Bogotá Film Festival, and many theaters, showing both contemporary films and art cinema. Bogotá's international art fair, ArtBo, takes place in October of every year and showcases thousands of works covering arts across all formats, movements, and concepts.

The main cultural center of the city is the La Candelaria, historic center of the city, with a concentration of universities and museums. In 2007 Bogotá was designated the Ibero-American cultural Capital of Iberoamerica.

=== Religion ===
Before the Spanish conquest, the beliefs of the inhabitants of Bogotá formed part of the Muisca religion. From the colonial period onwards, the city has been predominantly Roman Catholic. Proof of this religious tradition is the number of churches built in the historic city center. The city has been seat of the Roman Catholic Archdiocese of Bogotá since 22 March 1564. The seat of the Archbishop is the Primatial Cathedral of Bogotá; the archdiocese itself is located in new buildings in the north of the city.

As of 2023, Bogotá had six mosques, including Abou Bakr Al-Siddiq Mosque on Calle 80 and Carrera 30, Estambul mosque in Chapinero, and Centro de Estudios Al-Qurtubi on Calle 60.

There are a total of four synagogues in Bogotá, the main Ashkenazi Jewish synagogue is located on 94th street.

An Eastern Orthodox church and the San Pablo Anglican Cathedral, the mother church of the Episcopal Church in Colombia, are both located in Chapinero. The Bogotá Colombia Temple of the Church of Jesus Christ of Latter-day Saints is located in the Niza neighborhood. There are four Buddhist centers located in the north of the city. There is also a wide variety of Protestant churches in different parts of the city, including the Bogotá Baptist Chapel, the non-denominational Union Church, and the St. Matthaus Evangelical Lutheran Church which holds services in German as well as Spanish for the German-Colombian community.

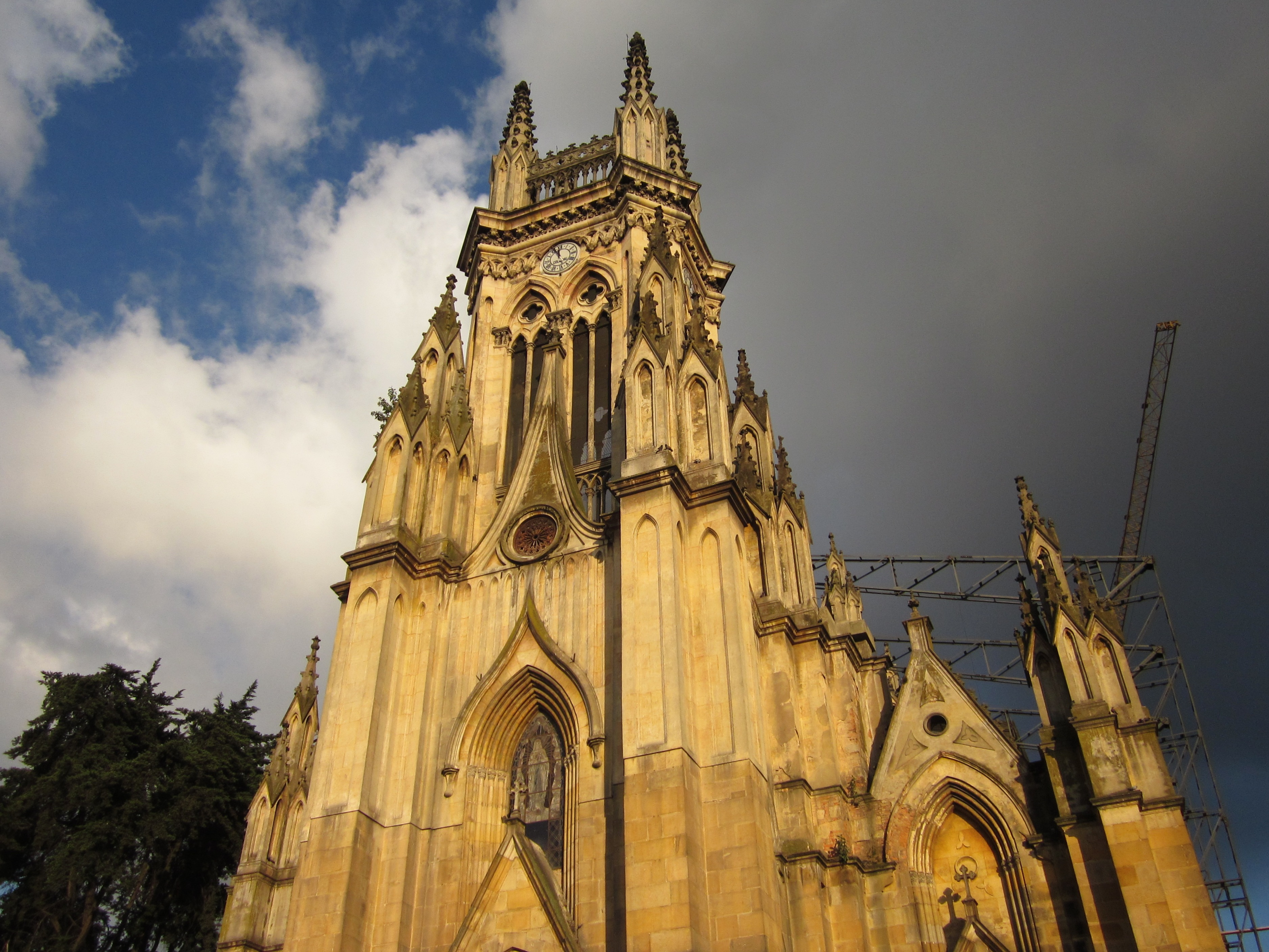
Church of Our Lady of Lourdes

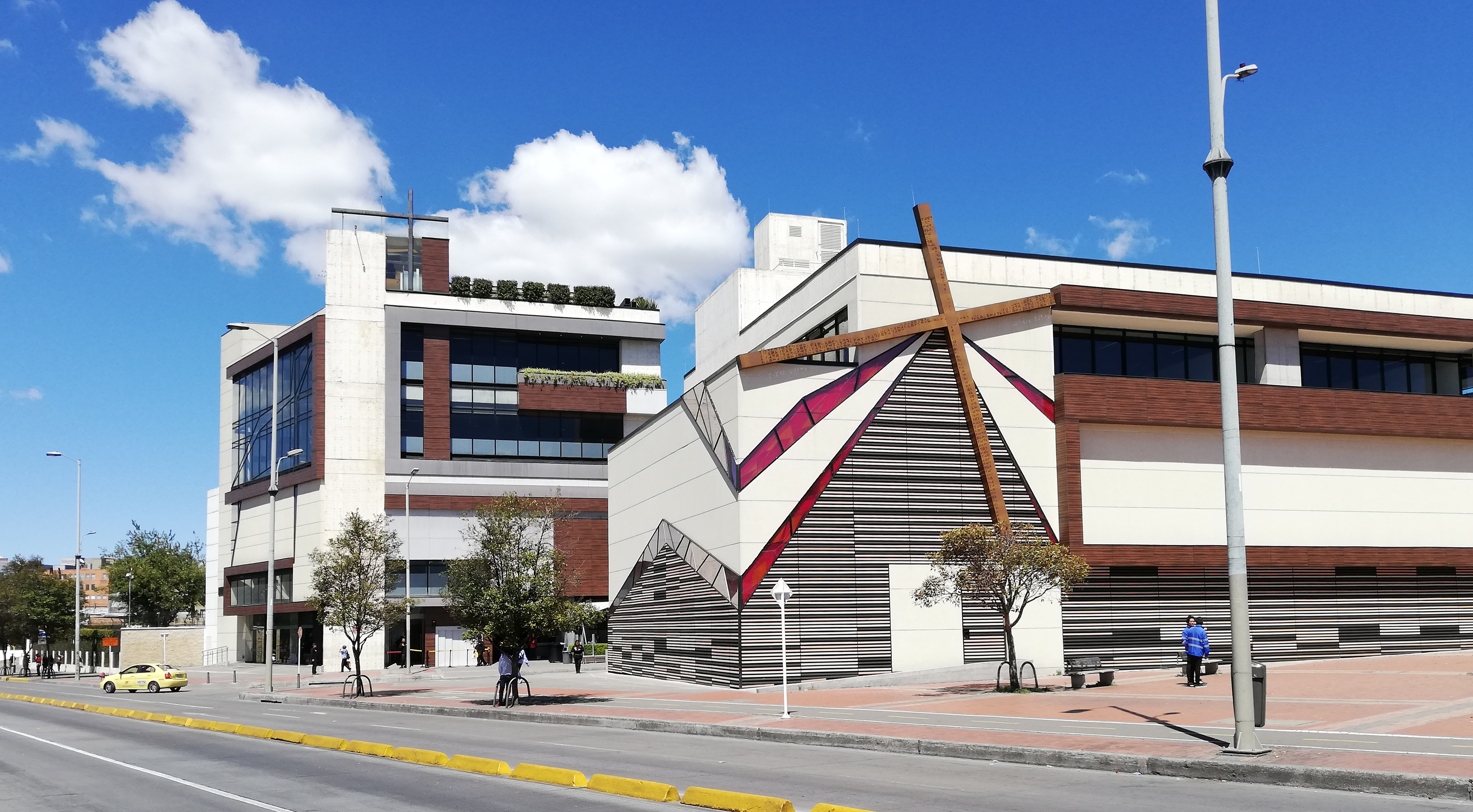
El Lugar de Su Presencia

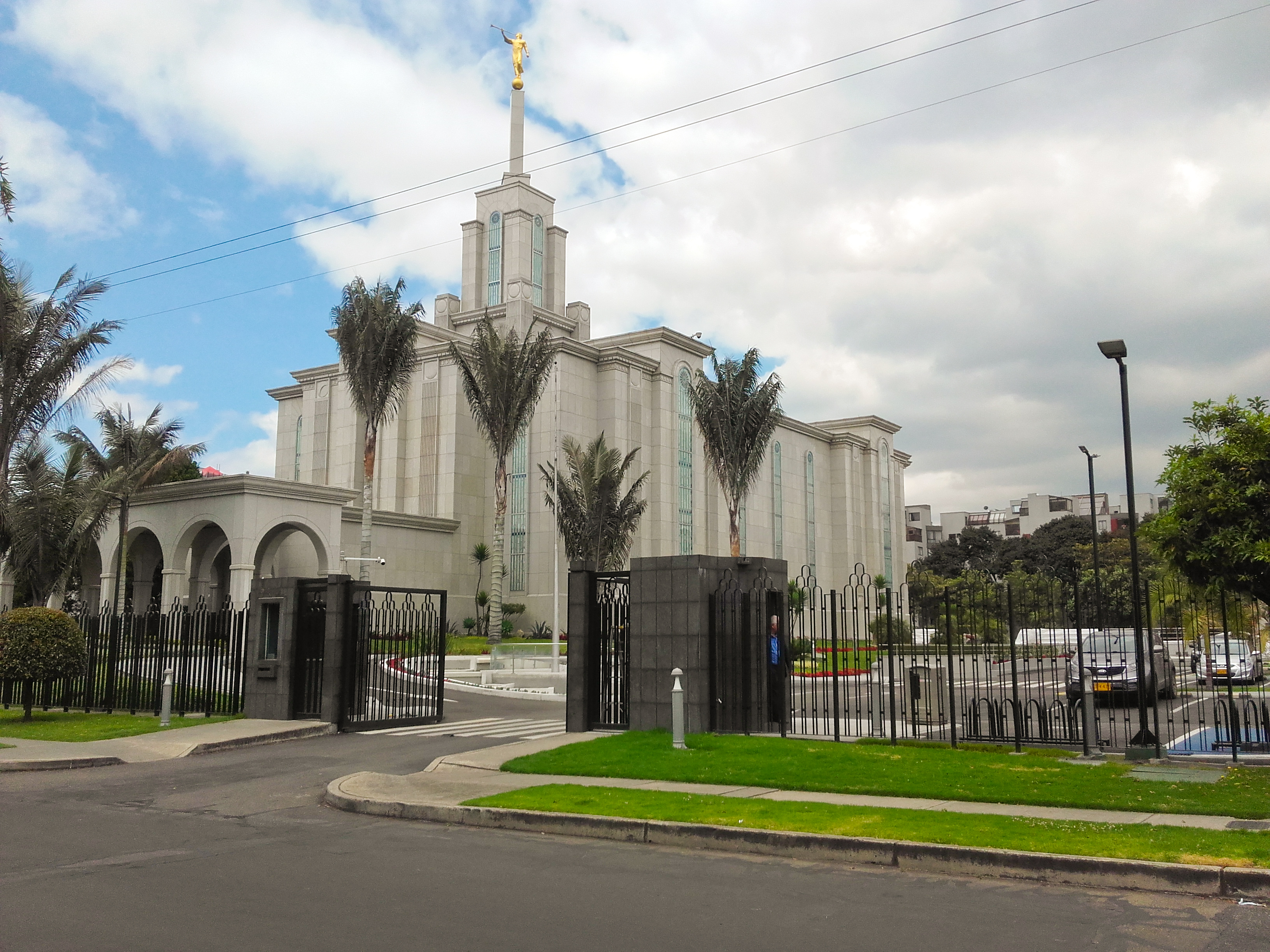
Bogotá Colombia Temple

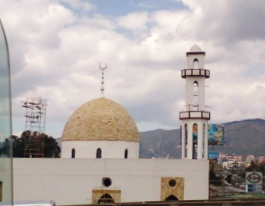
Abou Bakr Al-Siddiq Mosque

=== Cuisine ===
There is a broad array of restaurants in Bogotá that serve typical and international food. Parque de la 93, Usaquén, Zona T, The G Zone, La Macarena, La Candelaria, The parkway and the International Center are some of the main sectors where a number of international restaurants are found, ranging from Argentinian, Peruvian, Venezuelan, Brazilian, Mexican, American establishments to Arabic, Asian, French, Italian, Russian and British bistros, rotisseries, steakhouses and pubs, just to name a few. Typical dishes of Bogotá include the ajiaco, a soup prepared with chicken, a variety of potatoes, corn on the cob, and guascas (an herb), usually served with sour cream and capers, and accompanied by avocado and rice.

Tamales is a very traditional Bogotá dish. Colombian tamal is a paste made with rice, beef, pork and/or chicken (depending on the region), chickpea, carrot, and spices, wrapped in plantain leaves and steam-cooked.

Figs with arequipe, strawberries with cream, postre de natas and cuajada con melao are some of the main desserts offered in the city. Canelazo is a hot drink from the Altiplano prepared with aguapanela, cinnamon and aguardiente. Another hot beverage is the carajillo, made with coffee (tinto as it is known in Colombia) and aguardiente.

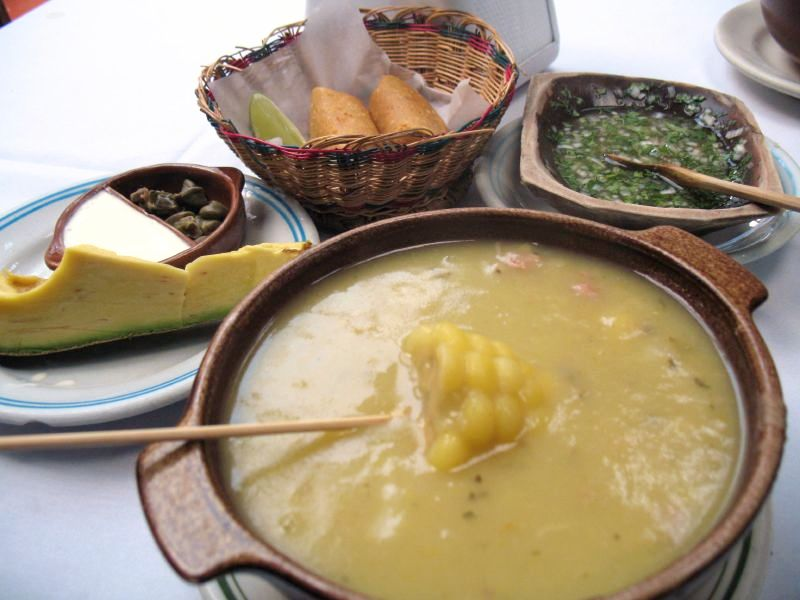
Ajiaco is one of the city's most representative dishes.

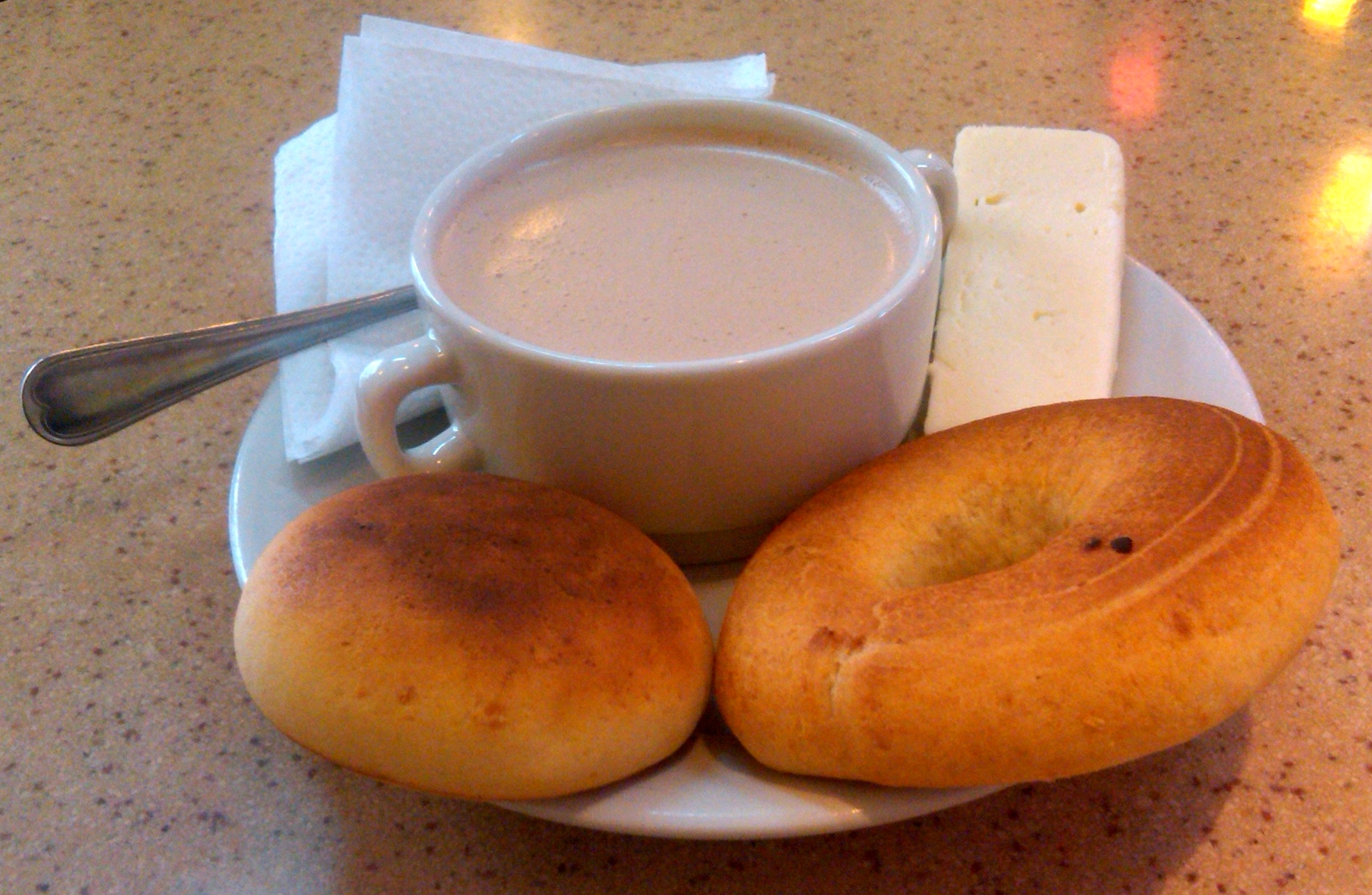
"Chocolate santafereño" (Santafe hot chocolate), almojábana, cheese and pandequeso

=== Parks and recreation ===
There are numerous parks in Bogotá, with facilities for concerts, plays, movies, storytellers, and other activities.

- Simón Bolívar Park is a large park regularly used to stage free concerts (such as the annual Rock al Parque festival).
- The public Parque Nacional (National Park) has green spaces, ponds, games for children, foot and bicycle paths, and venues for entertainment such as public screenings of movies and concerts and events organized by the Council of Bogotá
- The Bogotá Botanical Garden (Jardín Botánico de Bogotá)
- Mundo Aventura is an amusement park, with an entry charge and charges for the different attractions. It has rides for adults and children, a petting zoo, and even a small track for animal races.
- Salitre Mágico is another amusement park with rides and attractions. The park is near the Simón Bolívar park, where concerts are held throughout the year.
- Parque del Chicó has trees, gardens, artificial creeks and ponds, and a colonial-style house converted into a museum; Museo del Chicó
- To the north of Bogotá, in the municipality of Tocancipá; Jaime Duque Park has rides, a giant map of Colombia, various exhibits, a zoo, and a big hand holding the world, symbolizing God. There is a reproduction of the Taj Mahal in the park with a collection of reproductions of famous paintings. The park is also used for large concerts, mainly electronic music.
- Maloka is an interactive science museum, in the style of similar venues around the world.
- Tourist train is a sightseeing train, popular with Bogotá residents, which runs to outlying towns Zipaquirá, Cajicá and Nemocón along the lines of the former Bogotá Savannah Railway on weekends. The route to Zipaquirá (known for its salt cathedral) is 53 kilometers (33 miles) long. Another line goes towards the north for 47 km (29 mi) and ends at Briceño.
- The Usaquén Park is another of the most important parks in the city several of the best restaurants in this city are located there, is recognized to have street performers such as storytellers, magicians, jugglers, etc., and also for being one of the most decorated parks in the city during Christmas time.
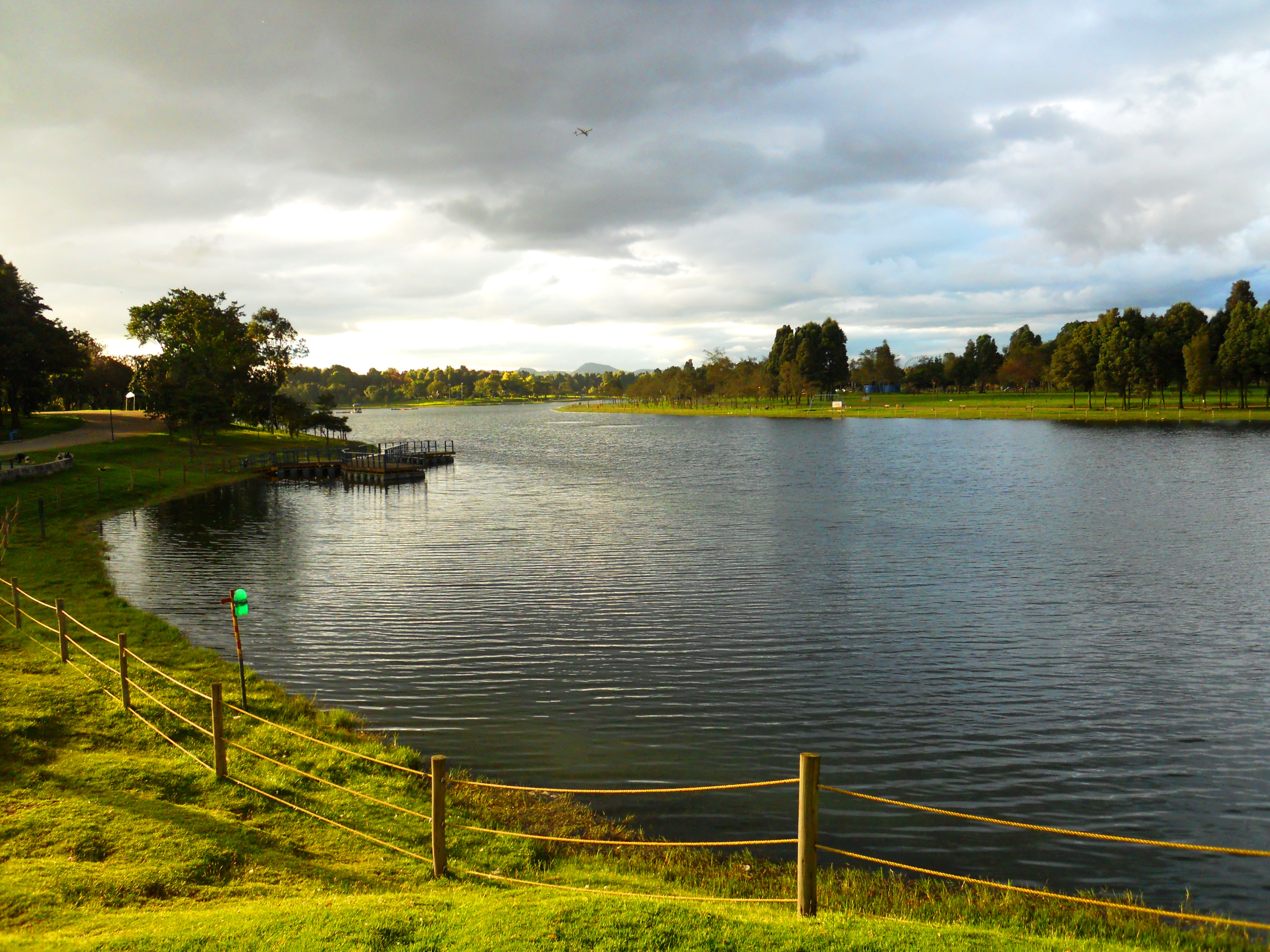
Simón Bolívar Park

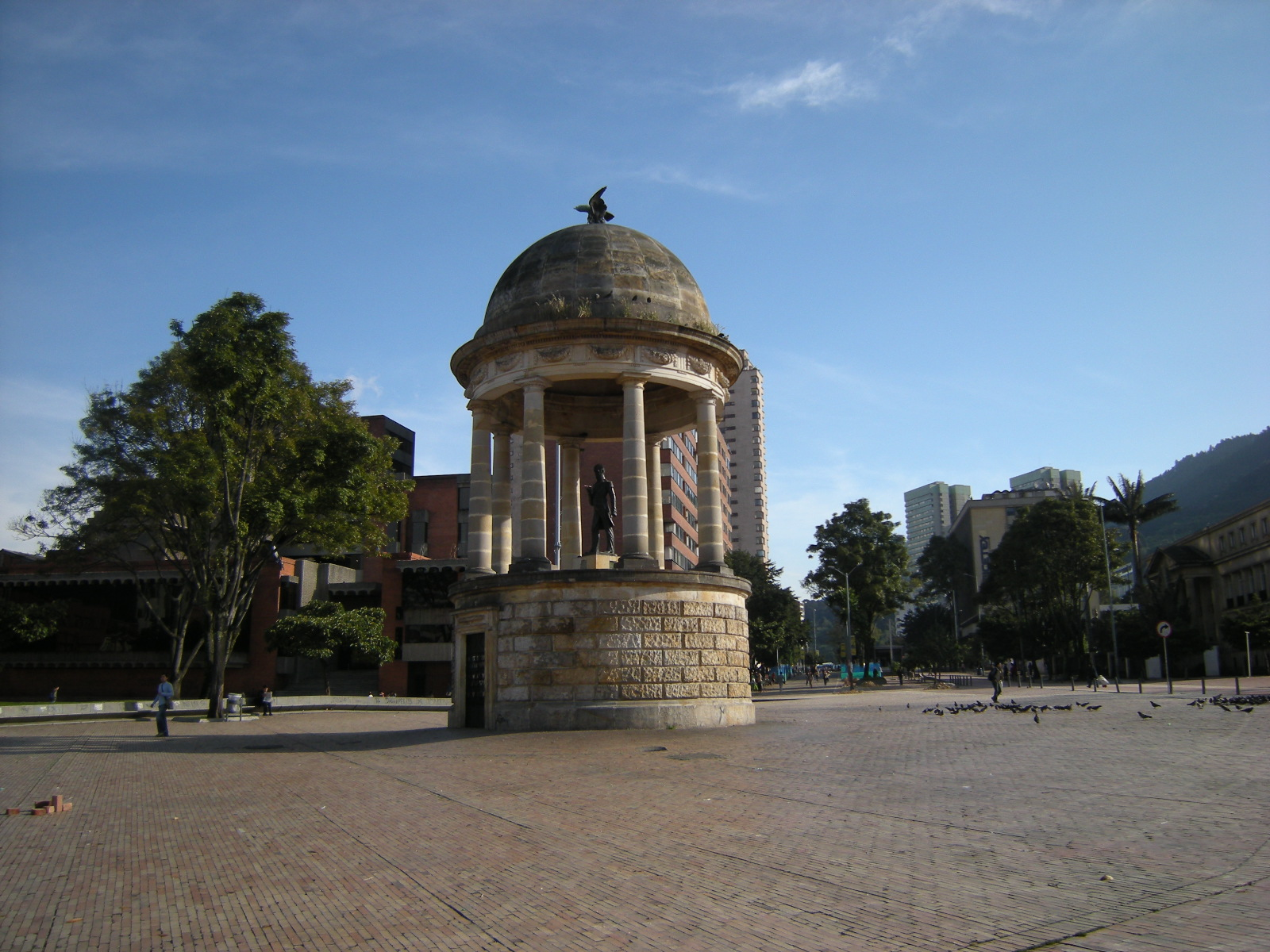
Park of the Journalists

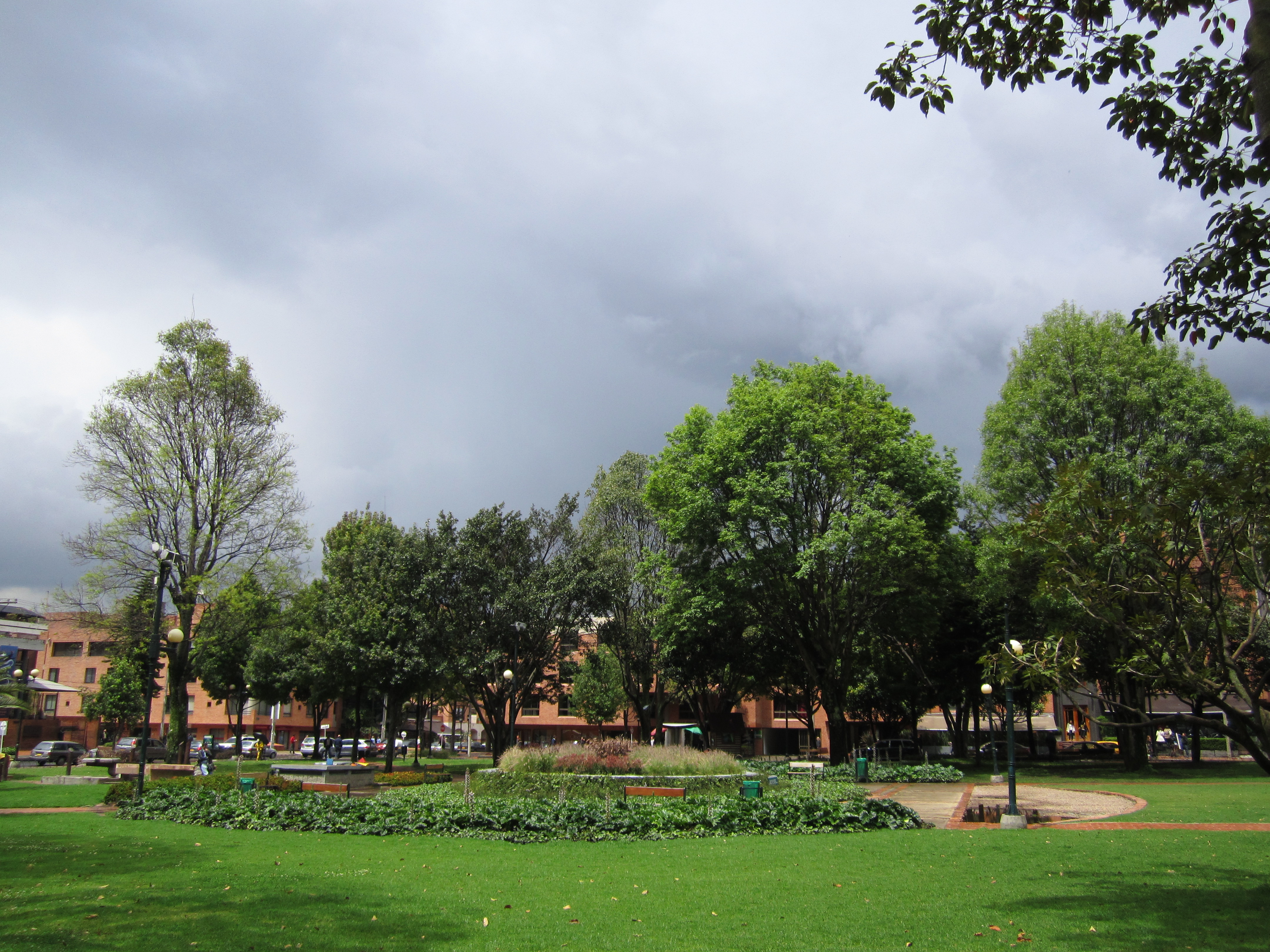
93rd Street Park

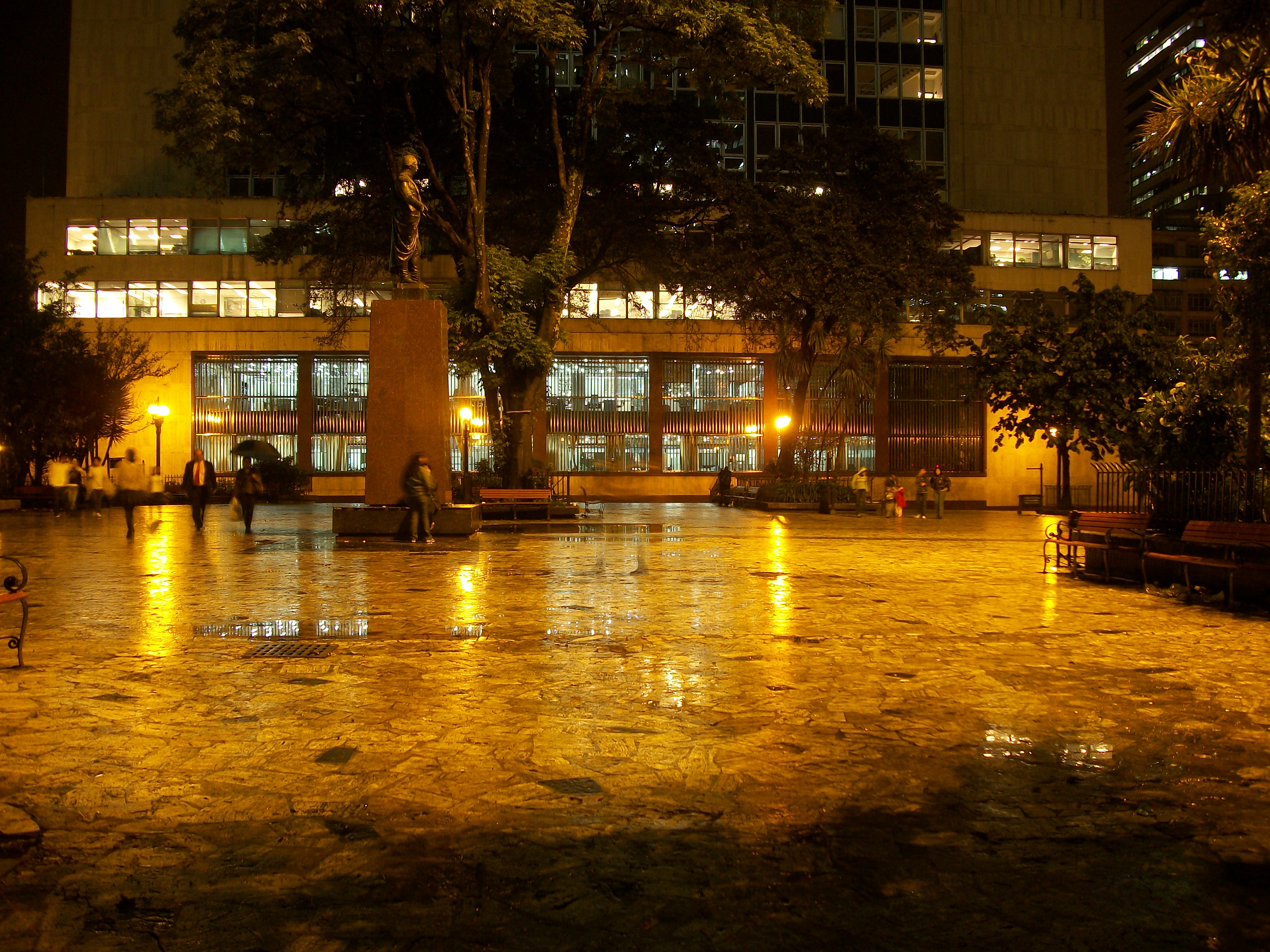
Santander Park

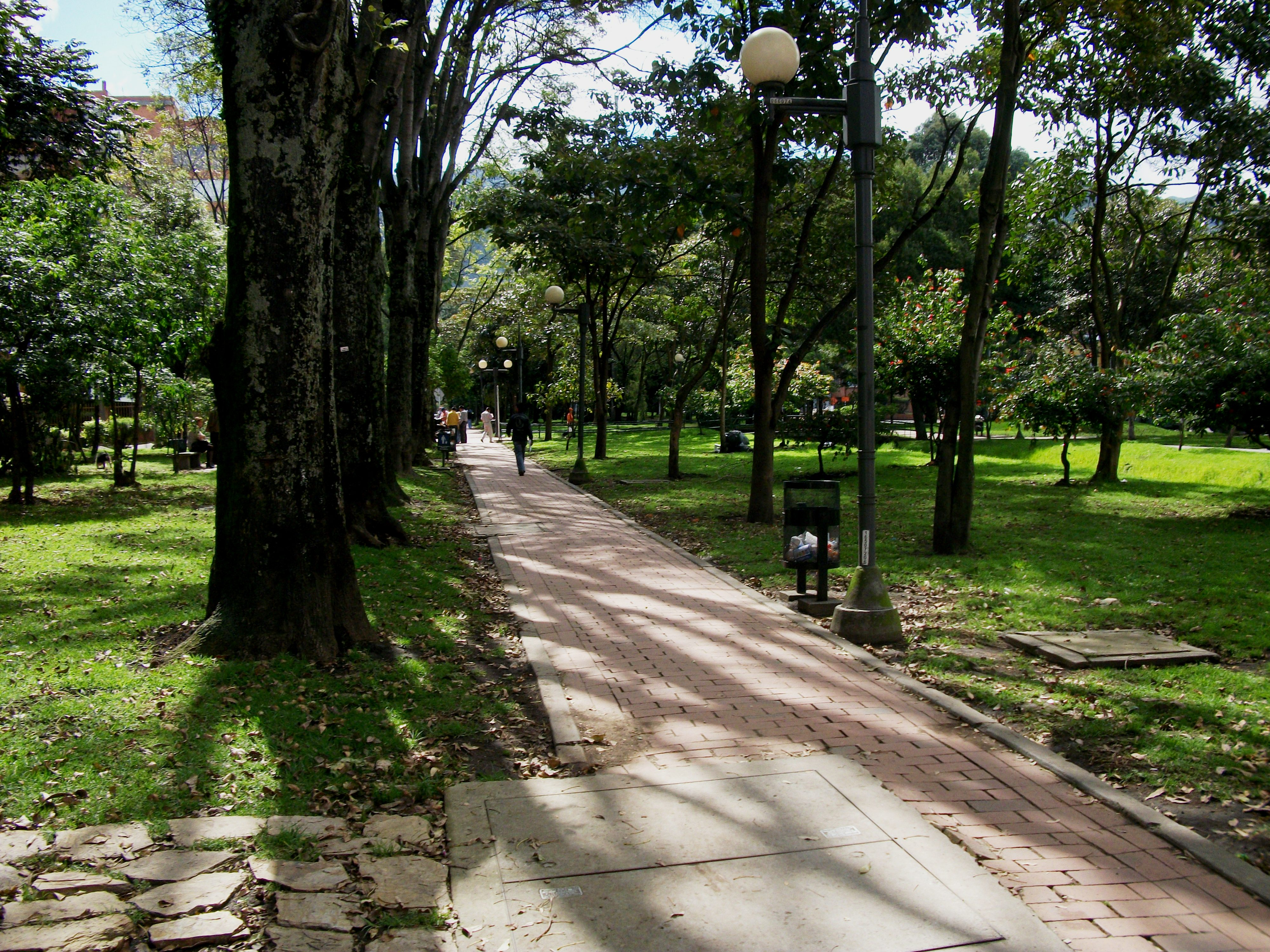
El Virrey Park

== Sports ==
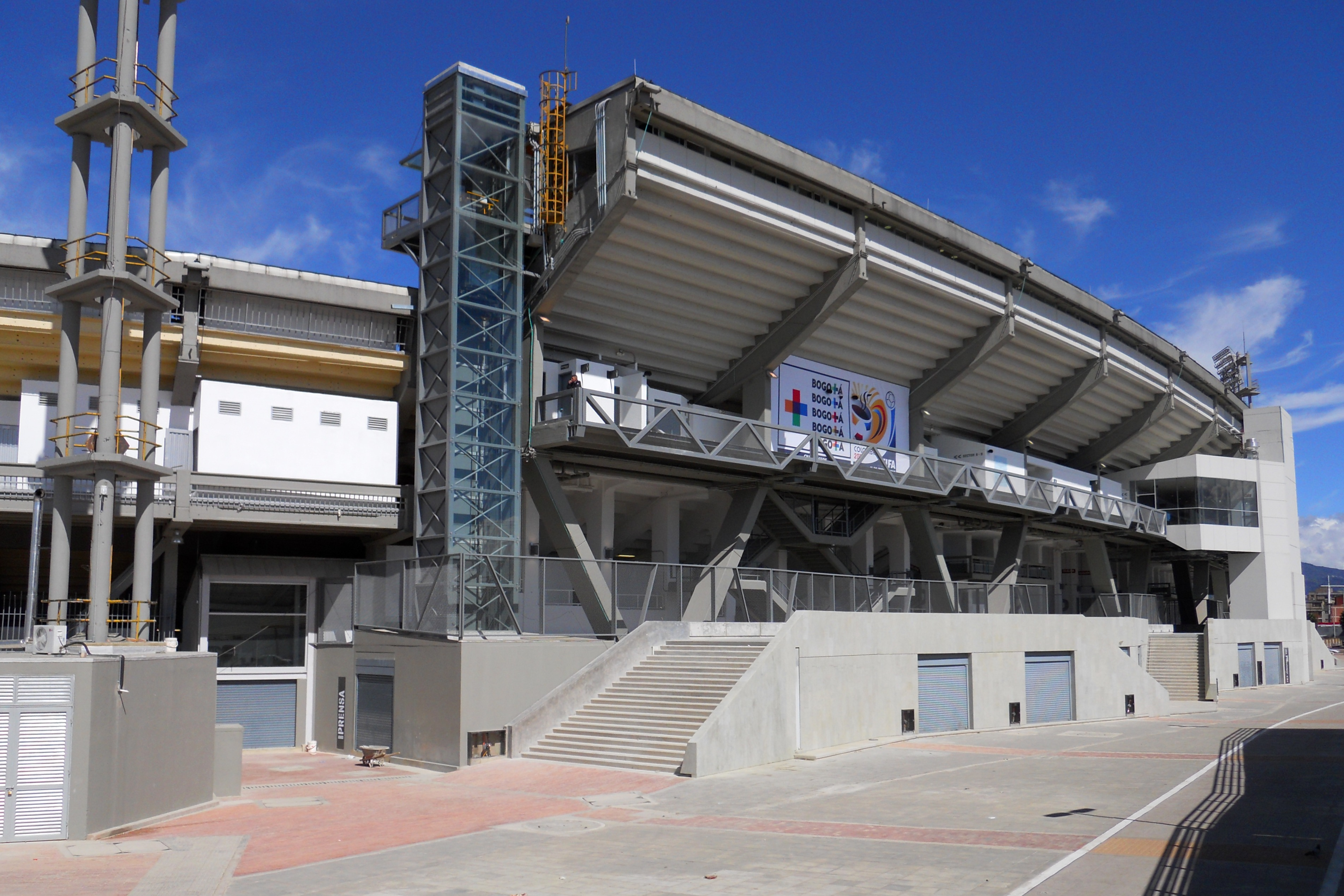
Estadio El Campín

The District Institute for Recreation and Sport promotes recreation, sports and use of the parks in Bogotá.

Football has been declared a symbol of Bogotá, and is widely played in the city. There are three professional clubs in the city, Santa Fe, Millonarios, and La Equidad. The main stadium in the city is The Campín Stadium (Estadio Nemesio Camacho El Campín) home of the local teams Santa Fe and Millonarios, In 2001 The Campín Stadium was the place for the 2001 Copa América final between the Colombia national football and the Mexico national football, with a final score 1–0 in favor of the home team, which finally obtained its first continental cup. The other soccer venue is the multi-use Techo Metropolitan Stadium which is the home of La Equidad.

Other major sporting venues are the covered Coliseum El Campín, the Simón Bolívar Aquatic Complex, the Sports Palace, the El Salitre Sports Venue which includes the Luis Carlos Galán Velodrome (which hosted the 1995 UCI Track Cycling World Championships), the El Salitre Diamond Ballpark and the BMX track "Mario Andrés Soto".

Bogotá hosted the first Bolivarian Games held in 1938. The city hosted the National Games in 2004, winning the championship. It was a sub-venue Bolivarian Pan American Games. In addition, the city is on the route of the Tour of Colombia.

After being a major venue city for the 2011 FIFA U-20 World Cup that was held in Colombia, Bogotá was one of the venue cities hosting the 2016 FIFA Futsal World Cup.

=== Sports teams ===
Team	League (Cup) / Sport	Stadium / Coliseum	Founded	Championships
Santa Fe	Categoría Primera A / Football	El Campín Stadium	1941	17 (10 Primera A, 1 Copa Sudamericana, 1 Suruga Bank Championship, 2 Copa Colombia, 3 Superliga)
Millonarios	Categoría Primera A / Football	El Campín Stadium	1946	20 (15 Primera A, 1 Copa Merconorte, 3 Copa Colombia, 1 Superliga)
La Equidad	Categoría Primera A / Football	Metropolitano de Techo Stadium	1982	1 (1 Copa Colombia)
Bogotá F.C.	Categoría Primera B / Football	Metropolitano de Techo Stadium	2003	0
Tigres F.C.	Categoría Primera B / Football	Metropolitano de Techo Stadium	2016	0
Guerreros de Bogotá	Liga DirecTV / Basketball	El Salitre Coliseum	2011	1 (1 league)
Piratas de Bogotá	Liga DirecTV / Basketball	El Salitre Coliseum	1995	4 (4 league)
Bogotá Bulldogs	Australian rules football		2015	

== Symbols ==
=== Flag ===
Flag of Bogotá

The flag originated with the insurgency movement against the colonial authorities which began on 20 July 1810, during which the rebels wore armbands with yellow and red bands, as these colors were those of the Spanish flag used as the flag for the New Kingdom of Granada.

On 9 October 1952, exactly 142 years after these events, decree 555 of 1952 officially adopted the patriotic armband as the flag of Bogotá. The flag of Cundinamarca follows the same pattern, plus a light blue tile which represents the Virgin Mary's cape.

The flag itself is a yellow band above a red one. The yellow denotes the gold from the earth, as well as the virtues of justice, clemency, benevolence, the so-called "mundane qualities" (defined as nobility, excellence, richness, generosity, splendor, health, steadfastness, joy and prosperity), long life, eternity, power and constancy. The red denotes the virtue of charity, as well as the qualities of bravery, nobility, values, audacity, victory, honor and furor, Colombians call it the blood of their people.

=== Coat of arms ===
Coat of arms of Bogotá

The coat of arms of the city was granted by emperor Charles V (Charles I of Spain) to the New Kingdom of Granada, by royal decree given in Valladolid, Spain on 3 December 1548. It contains a black eagle in the center, which symbolizes steadfastness. The eagle is also a symbol of the Habsburgs, which was the ruling family of the Spanish empire at the time. The eagle is crowned with gold and holds a red pomegranate inside a golden background. The border contains olive branches with nine golden pomegranates on a blue background. The two red pomegranates symbolize audacity, and the nine golden ones represent the nine states which constituted the New Kingdom of Granada at the time. In 1932 the coat of arms was officially recognized and adopted as the symbol of Bogotá.

=== Anthem ===
Bogotá's anthem lyrics were written by Pedro Medina Avendaño; the melody was composed by Roberto Pineda Duque. The song was officially declared the anthem by decree 1000 31 July 1974, by then Mayor of Bogotá, Aníbal Fernandez de Soto.

=== Others ===
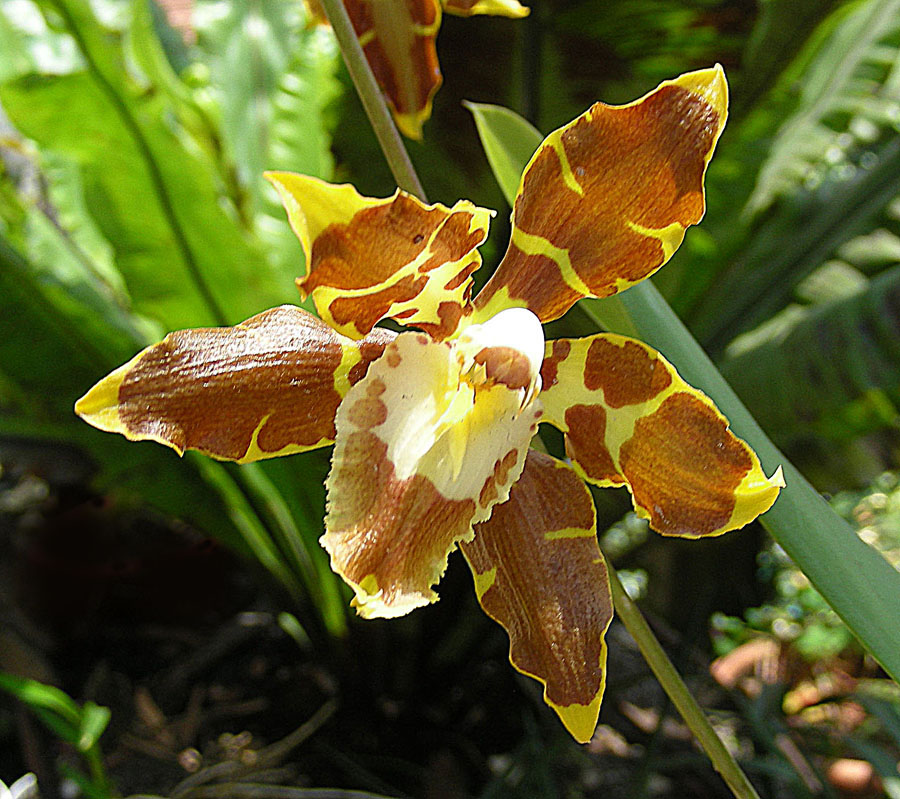
Odontoglossum luteopurpureum

The walnut tree (Juglans neotropica) was declared the emblematic tree of the city by District Agreement No. 069 of 2002.

By initiative of the Bogotá City Council through Project 088 of 2003, and by Agreement No. 109 29 December 2003, the orchid Odontoglossum luteopurpureum (Lindl.) was adopted as the emblematic flower of Bogotá, highlighting this species—found in the hills surrounding the Bogotá savanna—for its protection.

The symbolic sport of the city is futsal, according to City Council Agreement 133 of 2004.

The patron saint of the city is Saint Elizabeth of Hungary, by consecration of the Archdiocese of Bogotá since the late 19th century.

== International relations ==
=== Twin towns – sister cities ===
Bogotá is twinned with:

- Buenos Aires, Argentina
- Cádiz, Spain
- Chicago, United States
- León, Mexico
- London, England, United Kingdom
- Lima, Peru
- Madrid, Spain
- La Paz, Bolivia
- Quito, Ecuador
- Santa Fe, Spain
- Seoul, South Korea

=== Union of Ibero-American Capital Cities ===
Bogotá is part of the Union of Ibero-American Capital Cities established on 12 October 1982.

=== Partnerships and cooperations ===
In addition, Bogotá cooperates with:

- New York City, United States

== Panoramas ==
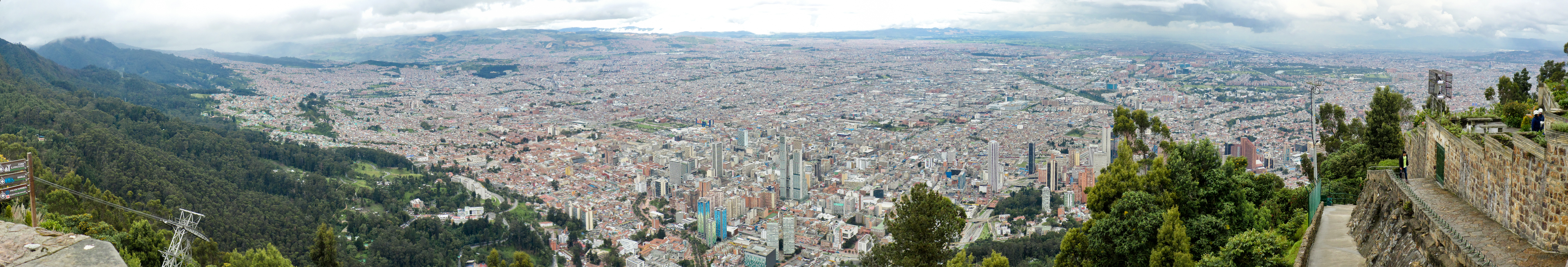
Panoramic view of Downtown and Southern Bogotá
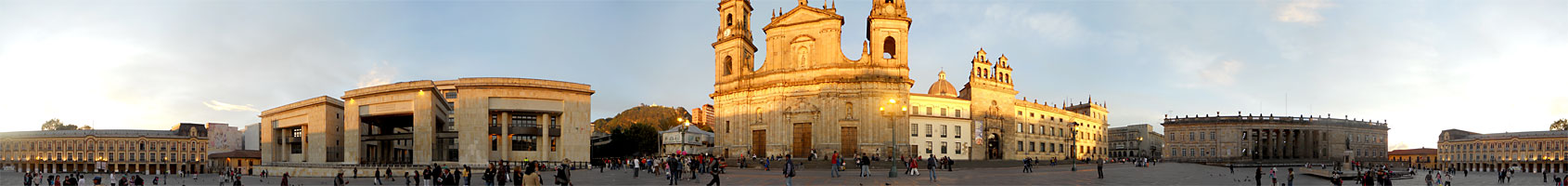
View of Plaza de Bolívar, Bogotá

== See also ==
- Carnival of Bogotá
- List of largest cities
- Transport in Colombia
