= Guerra del centavo =

Period in the history of Bogotá, Colombia

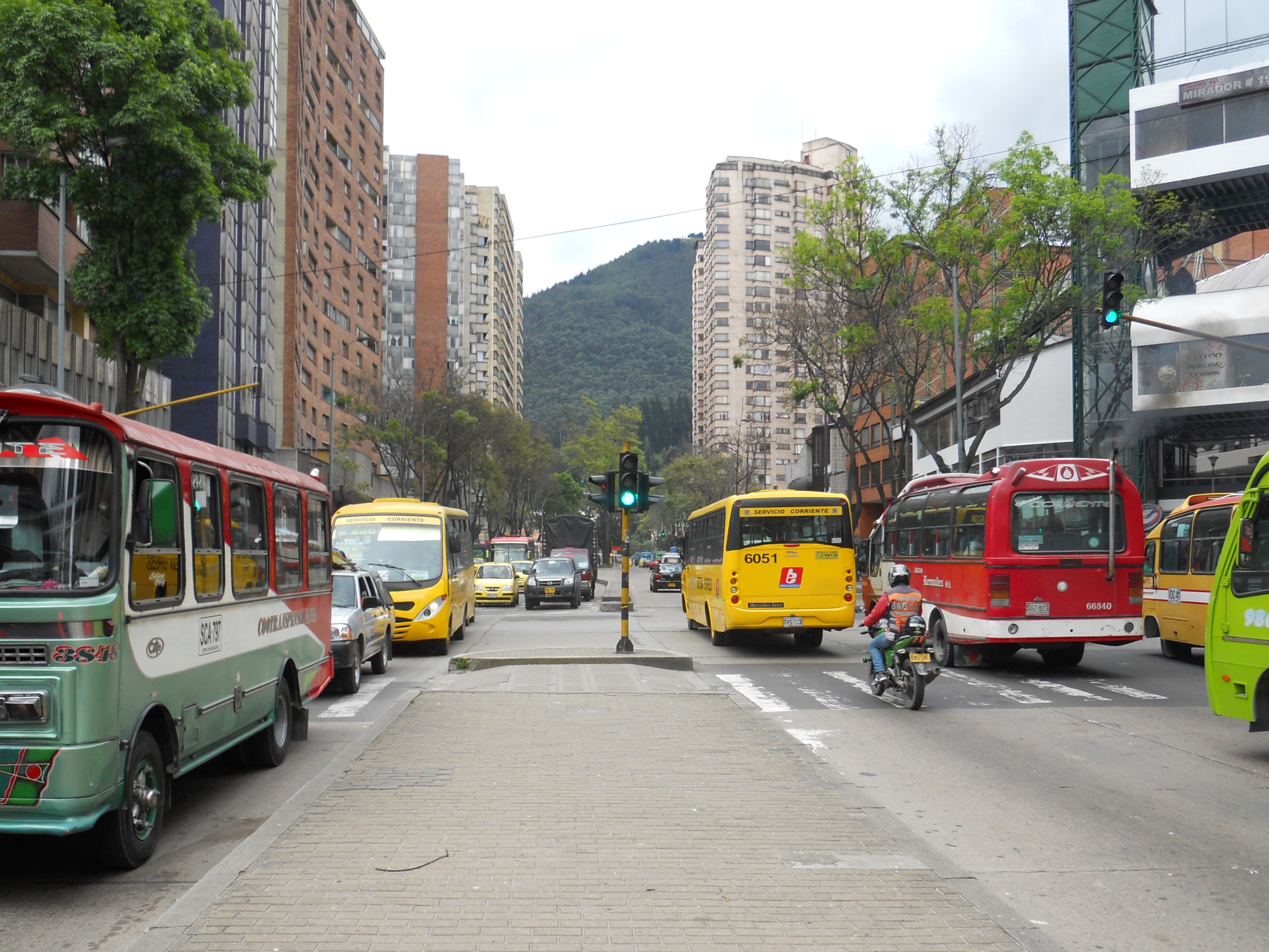
A group of buses in central Bogotá. The guerra del centavo period was marked by an oversupply of buses throughout the city causing monopolistic competition.

Guerra del centavo (Latin American Spanish pronunciation: [ˈgera ðel senˈtaβo], 'penny war') is the name given to a period in the history of Bogotá, capital city of Colombia, where deregulation of public transport following privatization led to an oversupply of buses throughout the city, which led to a market of monopolistic competition that created several problems, including a history of labor abuse, a decline in the quality of the service, constant increases in prices, rapid deterioration of transport-related infrastructure like streets, as well as fueling behavior that increased the likelihood of traffic-related accidents.

The guerra del centavo period is normally seen as having taken place between the 1960s and the 1990s, coinciding the end of this era with the opening of BRT system TransMilenio in 2000, although the term itself has also sometimes been used to describe the situation of mobility in the city from before the implementation of the Integrated Public Transport System (SITP), and ever after.

== Causes ==
During and following the Bogotazo (a riot that took place after the assassination of presidential candidate Jorge Eliécer Gaitán in 1948), Bogotá's tram railway network (which was the main method of transportation in the city at the time) was largely destroyed, prompting a debate on whether the city should rebuild the tram network, or move to using buses, which had already existed in the city since the 1930s, competing with the trams. The debate led to the city abandoning trams altogether in 1951, instead adopting buses as the only form of public transportation available throughout the city.

The bus system was originally structured as a service provided by the public sector, however, due to financial and bureaucratic reasons, the system was gradually privatized by allowing companies to operate and own routes and to sell bus drivers a right to drive through said routes in exchange for a commission the bus driver gave to the company, thus incentivizing bus drivers to collect as much money as they possibly could in order for them to earn a livable wage, as bus drivers did not have a fixed wage because they worked as independent contractors for the companies owning the routes they drove through. Also, because the owners of the routes made a profit based on the number of bus drivers paying royalties to have the right to drive through their routes, they actively sought to increase the amount of buses circulating through the city, thus creating several problems in the process, such as worsening traffic jams, creating monopolistic competition between the drivers and the consequences these problems bring themselves such as increased mortality rates on the road, or worsening of the mental health of drivers.

== Consequences ==
Guerra del centavo translates literally as 'cent war' or 'penny war', though a more fitting translation would be 'war for the penny'. The reason this time period was named as such is because, during it, bus drivers would do anything to be the first ones to collect passengers, even if it meant risking their own lives or those of their passengers. Constant stops within a short time period and sudden braking were also omnipresent.

Added to this, the period was also characterized by the prevalence of buses in poor conditions, overcrowded, and a general perception of safety absence in the system worsened by rampant theft taking place within the buses. Some of these other issues, particularly those concerning safety, have passed beyond this time period and continue to be a problem today. Additionally, the high amount of buses circulating through the city during this period caused an oversupply problem, which created high amounts of carbon emissions, thus reducing the quality of air and causing other environmental issues throughout the city. The problem of emissions was so big, a study for the National University of Colombia in 2007 concluded, an end to the oversupply issue and the guerra del centavo as a whole would decrease pollution emissions in the city by 20%.

== End ==
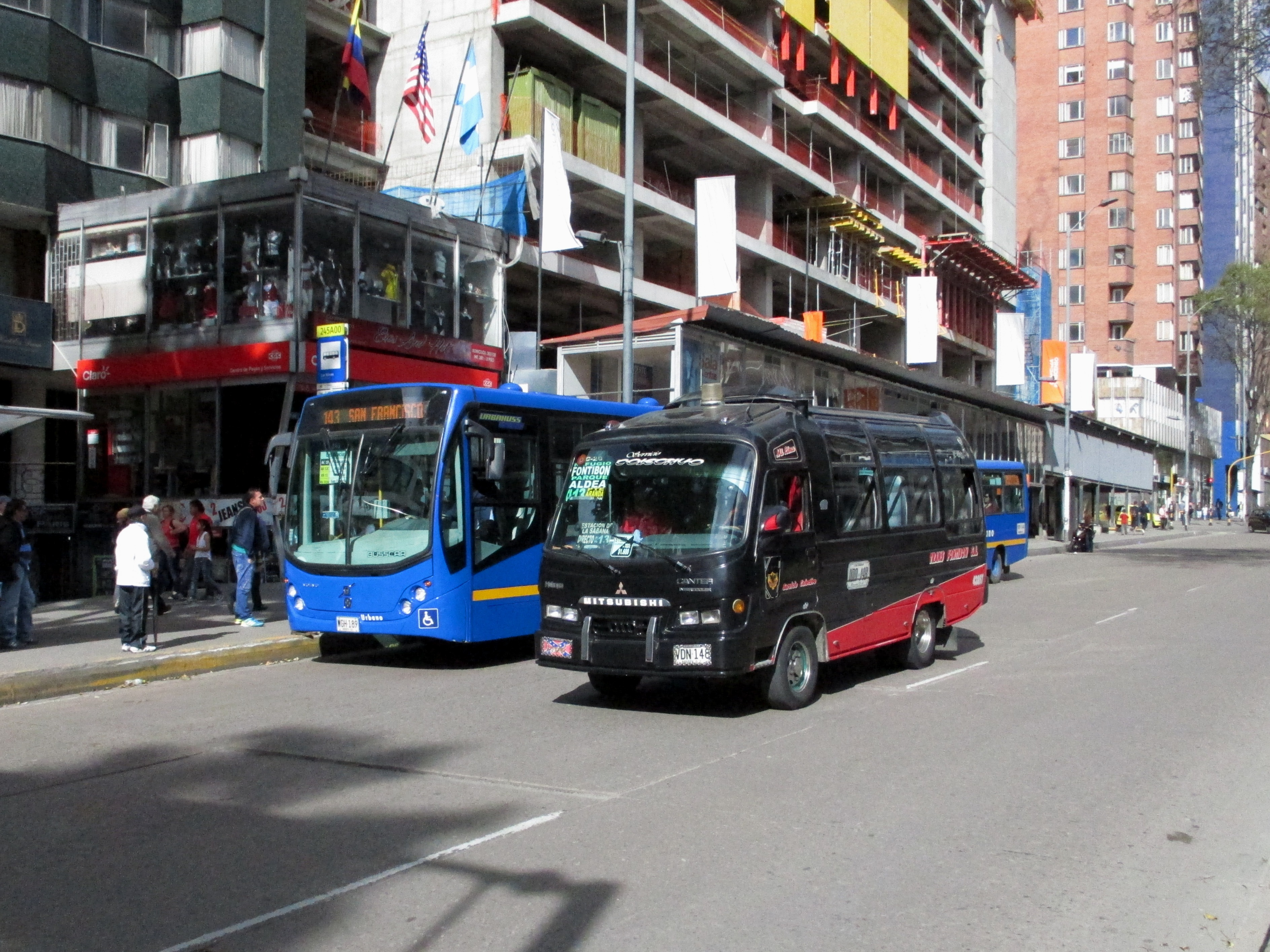
An SITP bus (left) next to a guerra del centavo-era bus (right).

No consensus exists on when exactly did the guerra del centavo period end, if it really did at all, or it restarted. When it is argued the period did end, even if argued it has restarted at some point, the end of the original period is normally seen as taking place between the 2000s and 2020s, with the inauguration of the bus rapid transport (BRT) system TransMilenio, the Integrated System Public Transport System (SITP, by its Spanish-language initials) in 2012, and the dismantling of a provisional network that was largely the continuation of the previous model in 2021.

Before TransMilenio, attempts at improving the quality of public transport in Bogotá started as early as the 1970s, with the mass introduction of state-operated trolleybuses (which had existed to a lesser degree since the 1940s), which failed to attract long-term popularity due to their lack of coverage, thus eventually disappearing in 1991. In 1989, during the administration of Andrés Pastrana as city mayor, the Troncal Caracas, (Note: (Latin American Spanish pronunciation: [tɾoŋˈkal kaˈɾakas])) a bus lane with determinated stops across Avenida Caracas, was built and inaugurated, alongside a series of design changes at the avenue that were largely seen as counterproductive. In 1994, during the administration of Jaime Castro Castro, a contract was signed allowing the construction of the Metrobus, (Note: (Latin American Spanish pronunciation: [metɾoˈβus])) a BRT system described years later as a "proto-TransMilenio" by journalists. The original contract indicated the Metrobus should have started its construction by June 1995, at the time of the administration of Castro's successor, who ended up being Antanas Mockus, but this date was delayed for 6 months, due to organizational issues between the city government and trash collectors around the zone of operation of the system. Later, in December 1995, the date was delayed once again for another 6 months, this time at the request of the company building the project, in order to do studies relating to the fundamental aspects of the design of the project. The project was later deemed unprofitable and scrapped in 1996.

TransMilenio itself was created first mentioned in a legal document early in the administration of Enrique Peñalosa, specifically at Article 17 of the Agreement 6 of 1998 of the City Council, better known as the Development Plan "Por la Bogotá que queremos", (Note: (Latin American Spanish pronunciation: [poɾ la βoɣoˈta ke keˈɾemos], 'for the Bogotá we want')) and its operator was later structured by the Agreement 4 of 1999 of the City Council and the Decree 831 of 1999 of the City Government. The construction of the system started in November 1999, and the system was opened to the public on December 18, 2000.

Since late 2007, plans for an integrated public transportation system fully replacing the still then existent system of private buses that had led to the guerra del centavo in the first place started to be suggested shortly before and during the administration of Samuel Moreno. Moreno announced a series of biddings for the operation of the system, the SITP, in 2009 to be concluded in December 2010. However, since 2011, a series of delays on the date of opening of the service occurred associated with lack of transparency surrounding the biddings. The system was first opened in July 2012, during Gustavo Petro's administration in the city, in response to delays in the construction of expansions of TransMilenio infrastructure. The SITP was not implemented fully at this moment, as its implementation would be gradual. A provisional system inheriting guerra del centavo-era buses, now administered by the operators of TransMilenio, was created in 2015 while the transition was completed. In theory, the system was supposed to work just like the SITP, except for the fact tickets would be paid with cash, as opposed to the cards used for TransMilenio and the SITP, but in practice, lack of knowledge from both bus drivers and users on how to use the system in the first place, including not using the SITP-assigned stops, resulted in what has been described as a "continuation of the guerra del centavo". The provisional service started being gradually phased out in 2018, being fully abandoned in 2021.

== Impact ==
=== In popular culture ===
In 1985, a documentary called La guerra del centavo, directed by Ciro Durán, discussing the state of public transport in Bogotá at the time, was released.
