= RegioTram =

Rapid transit project in Colombia

RegioTram de Occidente
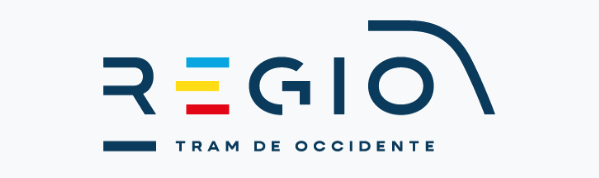

Overview
- Owner: Gobernación de Cundinamarca - Bogotá D.C.
- Area served: Bogotá savanna
- Locale: Bogotá, Colombia
- Transit type: Commuter rail Tram-train; Light rail
- Number of stations: 17

Operation
- Operation will start: 2024
- Operator: China Civil Engineering Construction Corporation

Technical
- System length: 39.6 km (24.6 mi)
- Track gauge: 1,435 mm (4 ft 8 1/2 in) standard gauge

The Bogotá suburban rail (Spanish: Tren de cercanías de Bogotá), also known as RegioTram, is a transportation project to create a light rail transport system to connect Bogotá with surrounding cities. The railways of the former Bogotá Savannah Railway (which have carried no passenger traffic since 1990) will be rebuilt to create a new tram-train network. Three lines are planned, to the west, north and south of Bogotá.

== Planned lines ==
Name	Route	Opening date	Length	Number of stations	Notes
RegioTram de Occidente	Estación Central (Calle 26. Av Caracas) - Facatativá	2027	36.9 km	17	Under construction
RegioTram del Norte	Estación de la Sabana - Zipaquirá		48 km	15	In design
RegioTram del Sur	Estación de la Sabana - Soacha	---	---	---	In project

== RegioTram de Occidente ==
The first Regiotram line, Regiotram de Occidente, will connect Bogotá with the municipalities of Mosquera, Madrid, Funza, Sector El Corzo and Facatativá in the department of Cundinamarca.

In February 2019, a Spanish consortium of Ardanuy Ingeniería and FGC was awarded a contract to provide project consultancy and supervision services for this first tram-train line. By August that same year, tendering for the line was launched by the Colombian government with a projected 2024 opening. In January 2020, the contract for construction and operation of Regiotram del Occidente was signed with Chinese company CCECC, with a concession of 26 years.

The line will be 39.6 km (24.6 mi) long and serve 9 stations in Bogotá and 8 in Cundinamarca. It will broadly follow the existing railway corridor. However, instead of running to Bogotá La Sabana railway station it will divert to terminate at Calle 26/Avenida Caracas, where it will offer interchange with the Bogotá Metro. Trains will run up to every 6 minutes in peak hours. There is also a possibility of a branch running to El Dorado International Airport.

There will be 18 electric vehicles of electric tram-train design, which will carry up to 884 passengers each at speeds between 28km/h and 70km/h. The line is expected to carry 130,000 passengers daily, or 40m per year.

== RegioTram del Norte ==
In August 2019, feasibility studies for the Northern Regiotram were announced, financed by the Prosperity Fund of the United Kingdom and the Government of Cundinamarca, supported by an agreement with Findeter. In May 2020, the studies and design contract for the project was signed. The project involves rebuilding the line from Bogotá to Zipaquirá for both freight and light passenger traffic. It was hoped that the line would open in 2024, with the total project cost of US$1.5bn.

In 2026, the Cundinamarca local authority requested tenders to design, build, operate, maintain and finance the line with a concession for 22 years including the six years prior to opening. The value of the tender is $US 4.5 billion. Construction is expected to begin in 2029 for a 2034 opening. The national government would contribute $US 3.7billion or 82 percent of the cost of the project and Cundinamarca would finance the balance.

The line will start at the Centro Comercial Gran Estación in Bogotá, and run for 48 km (30 mi) along the route of the existing railway (used by the Tren Turistico de la Sabana) through Chía and Cajicá to Zipaquirá. The line will have 17 stations. It is estimated that it will carry 187,000 passengers per day.

== See also ==
- Bogotá Metro
- Tramways of Bogotá
- Bogotá Savannah Railway
