= Diablos Rojos =

Diablos Rojos is the Spanish equivalent of Red Devils. It may refer to:

- Diablos Rojos (bus), brightly decorated buses that operate within Panama
- Diablos Rojos de Juliaca, a Peruvian football club
- Diablos Rojos del México, a Mexican baseball team
- Toluca FC, a Mexican football club nicknamed Diablos Rojos

== See also ==
- Red devils
