= SITP =

SITP may refer to:

- Stanford Institute for Theoretical Physics, a Stanford University research institute
- Skeptics in the Pub, an informal social event for skeptics
- Integrated Public Transport System (Spanish: Sistema Integrado de Transporte Público, SITP), the public transport system of Bogotá, Colombia
