= Bogotá Savannah Railway =

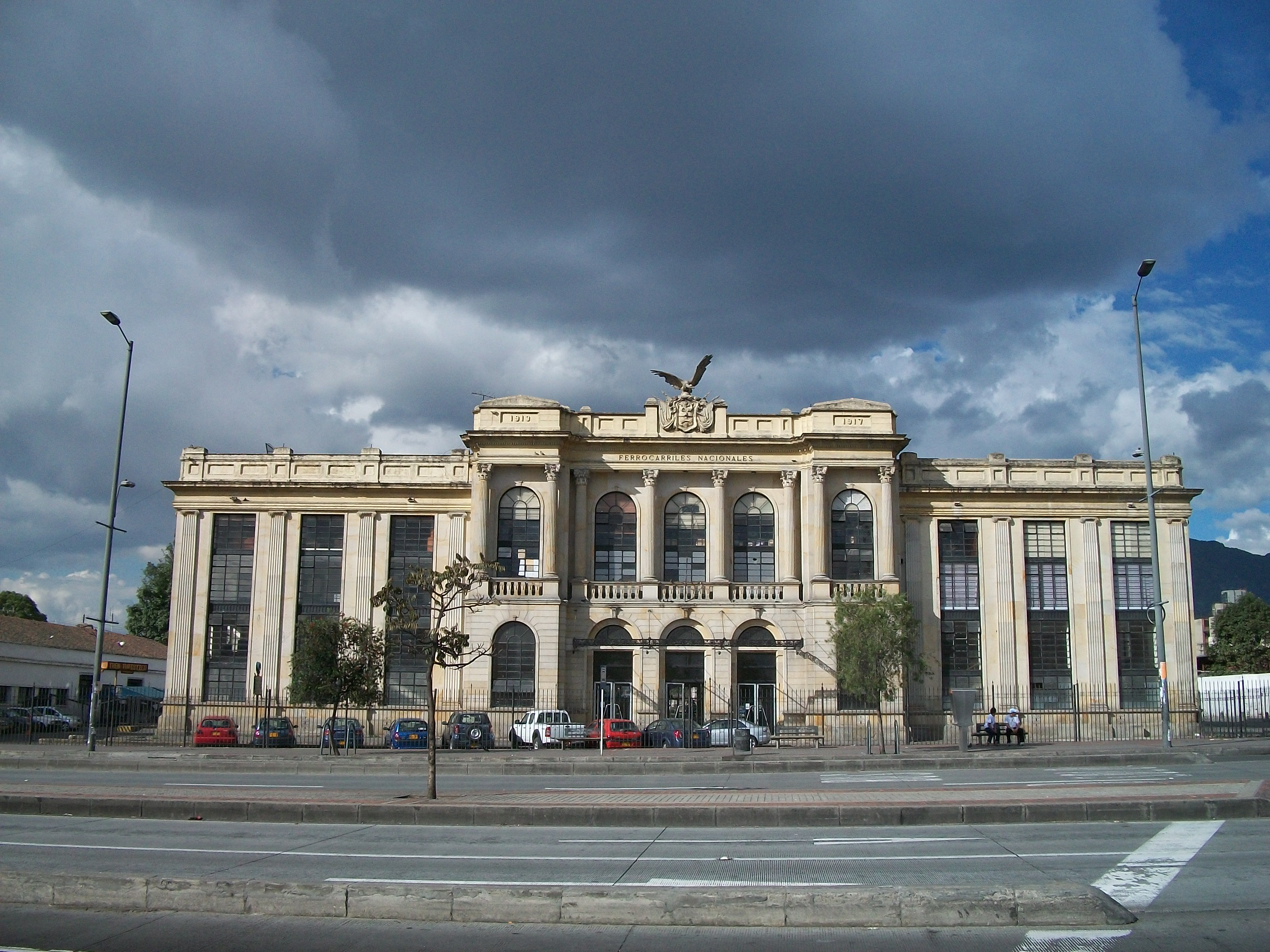
Central Station of the Savannah Railway in 2010

The Bogotá Savannah Railway was a company that provided transport for passengers from 1889 between the cities of the Metropolitan Area of Bogotá. The Savannah railway was liquidated in 1991 along with the National Railways of Colombia.

Currently, and from 1992, one of its lines (Northern line) was enabled to function as tourist train called Tren Turistico de la Sabana. RegioTram Occidente is planned to run on the routes of the former railway from 2024, connecting Bogotá with the Facatativá, Mosquera, Madrid and Funza from 2024.

== History ==
The construction of the Savannah Railway was authorized in 1873 and begun in 1882 by a British company. The works were suspended in 1886 when its length was just 18 km. A new contract was made with an American venture called "Savannah Railway Company". When the line was inaugurated its length was 40 km. In 1887 a new contract took place for the construction of the Zipaquira line. In time, the railways expanded across the Bogotá Savannah reaching a length of about 200 km.

In 1917 the Estacion de la Sabana was built by the English engineer William Lidstone; this building served as Central Station for the national railway as well. Its location was on the outskirts of the city on the west (today Calle 13).

The last expansion of the Bogotá Savannah Railway occurred in 1953. By that time the Railway's service covered the following towns: Chapinero, Usaquen, Sopo, Tocancipa, Nemocon, Suesca, Gachancipa, Cajica, Fontibon, Madrid, Mosquera, Facatativa, Bosa, Soacha, Sibate and Usme.

== The Bogotá Savannah Railway in 1953 ==
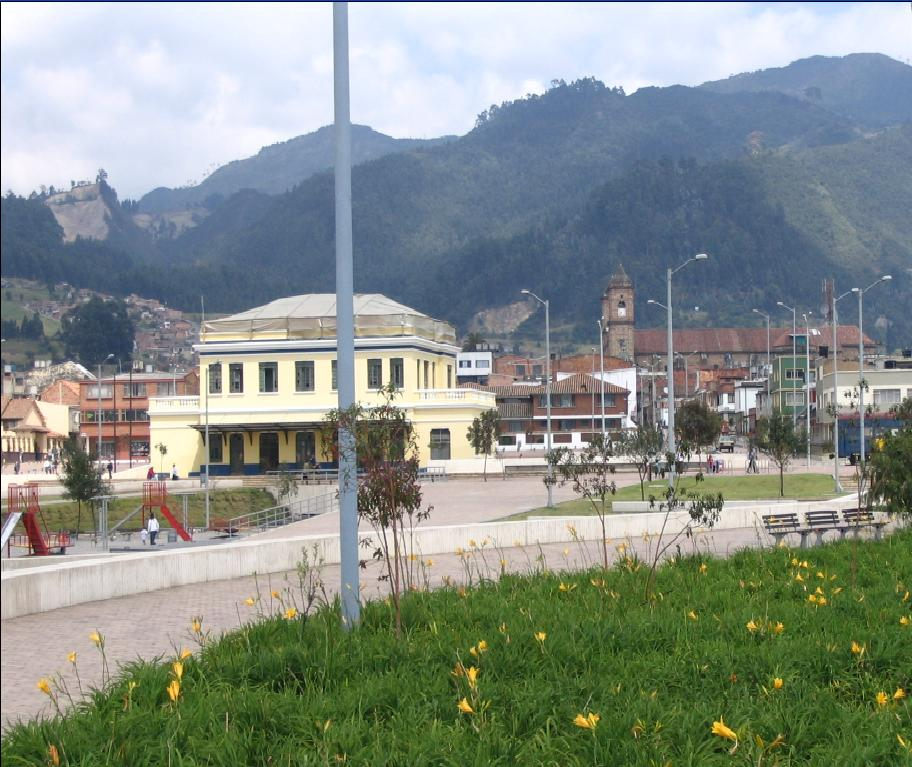
Restored station of the Savannah Railway in Zipaquirá

Stations of Ferrocarril del Occidente (Western line): (Opened en 1889)

1. Bogotá La Sabana (Main station of Bogotá)
2. Bogotá Puente Aranda
3. Bogotá Fontibón
4. Mosquera
5. Madrid
6. Facatativá

Stations of Ferrocarril del Sur (Southern line):

1. Bosa
2. Soacha
3. Alicachín, opened in 1916
4. Sibaté (Estación Santa Isabel), opened en 1926
5. San Miguel, opened en 1930

Stations of Ferrocarril del Norte (Northern line):

1. Puente del Común (Estación M. A. Caro, known as "La Caro") opened in 1894
2. Cajicá, opened in 1896
3. Zipaquirá, opened in 1898
4. Nemocón, opened in 1907

Stations of Ferrocarril del Nordeste (North Eastern line):

1. Chapinero
2. Calle 100
3. Usaquén
4. Puente del Común (Estación M. A. Caro)
5. Briceño (Sopó)
6. Tocancipá
7. Gachancipá
8. Suesca

Stations of Ferrocarril del Oriente (Eastern Line):

1. La Requilina (Usme)

== See also ==
- Metro of Bogotá
- Tramways of Bogotá
- RegioTram
