= Bogotá Metro =

Rapid transit system under construction in Bogotá, Colombia

Overview
- Native name: Metro de Bogotá
- Owner: Bogotá City; TransMilenio; IDU; ERU
- Area served: Bogotá and Cundinamarca metropolitan region
- Locale: Bogotá, Colombia
- Transit type: Rapid transit Metro
- Number of lines: 1 (planned)
- Number of stations: 16 (planned)
- Headquarters: Carrera 9 # 76-49, Floors 3-4 Bogotá, Colombia
- Website: www.metrodebogota.gov.co

Operation
- Operation will start: March 2028; 15 months' time (projected)
- Operator: Metro Línea 1 S.A.S.
- Character: Elevated
- Number of vehicles: 30
- Train length: 7
- Headway: 3 min

Technical
- System length: 24 km (15 mi) (planned)
- No. of tracks: 2
- Track gauge: 1,435 mm (4 ft 8 1/2 in) (standard gauge)
- Average speed: 43 km/h (27 mph)

The Bogotá Metro (Spanish: Metro de Bogotá) is a rapid transit project under construction in Bogotá, Colombia. It is projected to be in operation in 2028. Construction started in October 2020.

== History ==
=== Early proposals ===
The construction of the Metro de Bogotá has been the subject of debates and studies since the 1940s, when the collapse of the Bogotá Tramways made the need for a modern form of mass transport for the fast-growing metropolis evident. It has been suggested that the track routes of the defunct Bogotá Savannah Railway be utilized for the city's new metro system. Currently Bogotá has no rail service and its public transport system relies on the bus rapid transit system TransMilenio.

General Gustavo Rojas Pinilla began the process of contracting the studies of the metro with NYCTA. However, due to the coup that deposed his government, the project stagnated. In 1955, the city's government opted for bus-based transportation.

In 1981, Fedesarrollo performed a series of studies to estimate the cost of five lines. The project consisted of a 92km "main" line, with a construction period of five years for the first line, and an average cost of US$797 million. Nevertheless, due to the possibility of the 1986 World Cup being held in Colombia, the Armero tragedy and the Palace of Justice siege, the project was archived.

In 1987, six countries proposed alternatives to build the metro. In 1988, during Virgilio Barco's city government, it was announced that negotiations to construct the metro were being held with the Italian firm Intermetro.

=== 1990–2000: early planning ===
In 1990, the city government and the national government agreed on the technical and juridical aspects of the metro, however a consensus about the financing method was not reached. More than thirty options to finance the system, including a tax on gas. Due to these difficulties and the economical and social instability of the country at that time, the project was postponed indefinitely.

In 1991, Jaime Castro created the Metro de Bogotá company, he contracted feasibility, financing and construction studies.

In 1996, the mayor Antanas Mockus along with JICA released the Santafé de Bogotá Transportation Plan.

In 1996, Law 336: National Transportation Statute was passed. This law, commonly called "the metro law", mandates that the national government must contribute to the construction of a metropolitan rail system in Bogotá.

During 1996 and 1997, the National Planning Department (DNP) hired Fedesarrollo to define the financial and institutional strategy of the Sistema Integrado de Transporte Masivo (SITM - Mass Transit Integrated System) and the first metro line. The national government had already promised to cover 70% of the total cost, however the amount presented by Fedesarrollo was considered "too high".

In 1999, Colombia's economy went through a recession, which cut most of the funds destined for investing. Additionally, the crisis of the Social Security Institute (ISS) caused the government to invest heavily in it, to prevent its collapse. Since the government could not use the ISS's reserves to cover the deficits, it was forced to search for private investment, impacting interest rates. This caused the metro to be postponed again, since Bogotá was in need of a mass transit system after the collapse of the tramways and trolleybuses, a BRT system (Transmilenio) was constructed.

=== 2000s ===
After the inauguration of the BRT, the metro project did not progress and was commonly used as a political tool to catch voters in local elections.

In 2007, Bogotá City Council approved the budget for year 2008, including the amount to begin with feasibility studies. A week after, the president Álvaro Uribe backed the initiative to build the metro with some conditions: Phase III of Transmilenio must be continued as prevised, and that the metro should be auto-sustainable.

On March 19, 2008, the public tender for the design of the metro was published by Bogotá's city hall. Initially, 56 firms from 27 countries submitted their request. The number decreased to only six in may, and from these, only three complied with the requisites in order to ask funding from the World Bank: Ineco-Metro de Madrid, Davies and Gleave (United Kingdom) and Sener-Transporte Metropolitano de Barcelona, which won the contract. The selected consortium had a one-year term (until June 2009), to determine the outline of the first line, ticket fare, construction cost and the amount that the district and national government would have to pay; construction would start in the second half of 2011. The first line outline must, also, include transfers between the regular buses, BRT and the Bogotá's Savannah commuter rail.

The first delays occurred when Sener-Transporte Metropolitano de Barcelona, after receiving COP $19 600 million (US$9.9 million) from the city government, stated that the studies would not be finished before July 20, 2009. The company was granted three extensions to the original term. The DNP stated that the solution of technical problems was mandatory in order to receive national government funding.

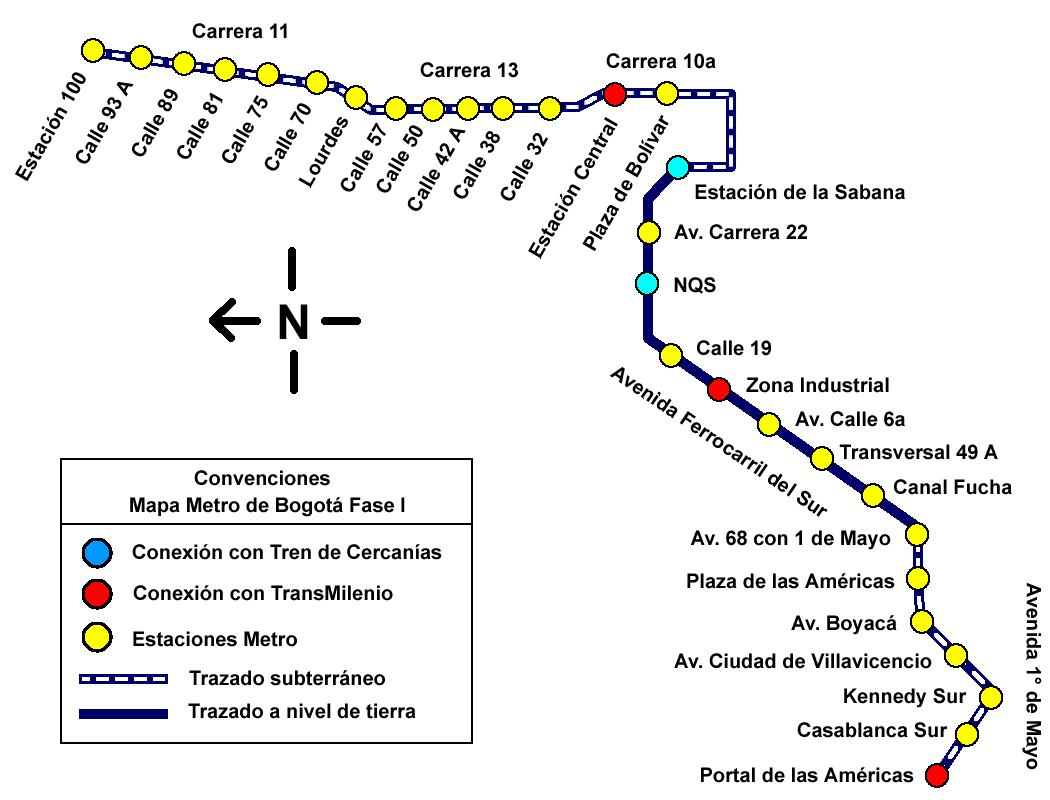
Outline of the 2009 design.

On August 19, 2009, Sener-Transporte Metropolitano de Barcelona (TMB), determined four routes for the metro: Calle 127 from Carrera 7 to Boyacá Av. in Usaquén district, going southwards through Boyacá Av. until Caracas Av., in Usme district; Primero de Mayo Av.; 68 Av. and; Carrera 13. The city mayor, Samuel Moreno, had previously proposed that the first line should go from Kennedy district, through Ferrocarril Av. until the Sabana Station, from there to downtown Bogotá through Calle 13, then northwards through Carrrera 7, and finally, westwards through Calle 72 until Engativá district.

A week after, mayor Moreno and president Uribe revealed officially the metro project: A subway beginning at Portal Américas, through Villavicencio Av., Primero de Mayo Av., Ferrocarril del Sur Av., Calle 22, Colon Av., Carrera 7, Carrera 13 and Carrera 11 until Calle 127. The cost of the first line was COP $13,9 billion pesos (US$3.9 million). It consisted of 27 Km., 20 of them underground. The final cost would be financed 70% by the national government, and also with future earnings of the metro. The cost differs from other similar projects, such as the Quito Metro in Ecuador due to Bogotá's complex soil.

In September 2009, Bogotá's mayor Samuel Moreno, announced that the system might be in operation by 2016.

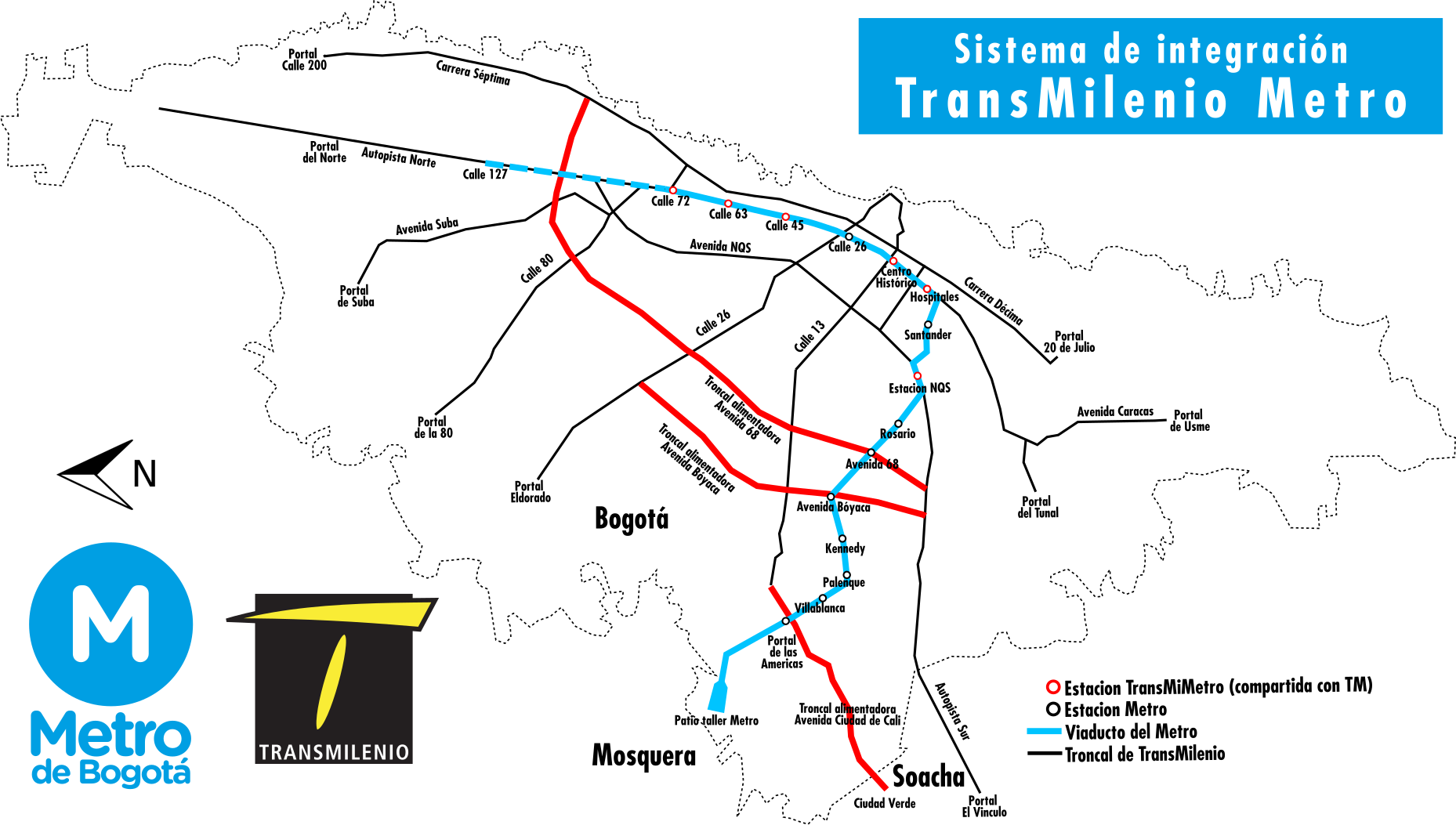

==== 2010s ====
In 2010, fiscal troubles besieged the city during Moreno's tenure and critics condemning Moreno's "improvisation" in the contracts arose from the congress. Moreno was arrested for improprieties in the appropriation of city contracts for public works projects, this was part of the Carrusel de la Contratación scandal. This threw the fiscal feasibility of the Metro project into doubt and the project was paralyzed. As of 2011, the administration of the new mayor Gustavo Petro announced that it would push for construction to start in 2013, he also stated that the metro should go to the northwestern Suba District, the most populous in the city.

On May 5, 2013, mayor Petro announced the "final agreement" for the construction of the metro. That agreement would validate the previous studies and the construction would begin in 2014. Four days after, he signed the final studies for the project. These would be finished 15 months after this date, in September 2014.

On October 7, 2014, Petro presented the final studies for the underground metro. The estimated cost was COP $15 billion (about US$7 million), more expensive than the 2009 project. The estimated inauguration date was 2021. However he could not finish the project before his term in office finished.

=== Current project ===
==== 2010s ====
In 2016, Enrique Peñalosa was elected mayor. On April 4, he announced the design of the stations of the new project. His proposal was an elevated metro, less expensive than the previous metro. On April 25, the city council approved the creation of the Metro de Bogotá company, 70% of the Board Directors will be appointed by the national government and 30% by the local government, it also will have independence from the local government.

On September 17, 2016, mayor Peñalosa and president Juan Manuel Santos presented the definitive outline of the project: from Portal Américas until Calle 127. It was announced that the metro would be constructed in three phases: first, from Portal Américas through Villavicencio Av., Primero de Mayo Av., NQS Av., Calle 1 until Caracas Av.; the second phase would go through Caracas Av. from Calle 1 up to Calle 72; and the third phase would go from Calle 72 up to Calle 127.

In January 2017, president Santos signed the CONPES document that would set the financing of the project. In November, the co-financing agreement was approved by the Superior Council of Fiscal Politics (CONFIS).

In October 2018, the requisites to participate in the public tender for the metro were published. In November, 102 interested companies assisted to the audience for the requisites in order to participate in the tender.

In February 2019, seven consortia sent their proposals for the public tender. In June 28, Mayor Peñalosa and president Iván Duque opened the public tender. On the last days of the next month, the public tender for the audit was released. In August 2019, five consortia were pre-selected after publishing their requisites. On October 3, the tender closed and only two firms turned in their proposals: Metro de Bogotá, mostly composed of Mexican capital, and APCA Transmimetro, composed of Chinese capital. Finally, on October 16, 2019, «APCA Transmimetro» was selected. This consortium was made up of China Harbour Engineering Company with an 85% share and Xi‘An Metro Company with a 15% share. On November 27, 2019, the Metro de Bogotá company and Metro Línea 1 S.A.S. (APCA) signed the US$4.3 billion contract to design, build, operate and maintain Line 1 of the Bogotá Metro.

==== 2020s ====
On January 27, 2020, Bogotá's mayor Claudia López announced studies with Findeter to extend the line up to Calle 100, in order to connect it with TransMilenio.

In August 2020, the audit consortium was selected.

In October 2020, an order was placed with CRRC Changchun Railway Vehicles for 30 driverless trains for the system. On October 20, the beginning of the contract was signed.

In December 2020, the city hall announced the second line of the metro: from Calle 72 station, westwards through Calle 72, Cali Av., Suba Av. and ALO Av. ending in Suba district.

In 2022, president (and former mayor of Bogotá) Gustavo Petro asked the China consortium in charge of the project to evaluate changes from elevated to underground construction while the contract was already advancing. In January 2023 alternatives were presented with a recommendation of no changes on the initial design of Line 1 and only extending this line 3.9km. President Petro insisted on underground options for the main portion of line 1. Proposed changes, if accepted, were estimated to result in greater costs and important delays.

In 2026, Bogotá's mayor Carlos Fernando Galan announced that Line 1 would begin operations on 15 March 2028.

== Line 1 ==
Station Name	Address	Transfer
Gibraltar	Av. Villavicencio between Carrera 93 and Carrera 94 Gibraltar, Kennedy	
Portal de las Américas	Av. Villavicencio between Carrera 86B and Carrera 86G Las Margaritas, Kennedy	
Carrera 80	Av. Villavicencio between Carrera 80D and Carrera 80G Britalia, Kennedy	
Timiza	Av. Primero de Mayo between Calle 42C Sur and Calle 42 Sur Timiza, Kennedy	
Kennedy	Av. Primero de Mayo between Calle 40 Sur and Calle 39 Sur Ciudad Kennedy, Kennedy	
Avenida Boyacá	Av. Primero de Mayo between Av. Boyacá and Carrera 72C Carimagua, Kennedy	
Avenida 68	Av. Primero de Mayo between Carrera 68 and Carrera 52C Tejar, Puente Aranda	
Carrera 50	Av. Primero de Mayo with Carrera 50 Ciudad Montes, Puente Aranda	
SENA	Av. NQS between Calle 17A Sur and Diagonal 16 Sur La Fragua, Antonio Nariño	
Carrera 24	Calle 1 between 24C and Carrera 24 El Vergel, Los Mártires	
Hospital	Av. Caracas between Calle 2 and Calle 3 Eduardo Santos, Los Mártires	
Avenida Jiménez	Av. Caracas between Calle 11 and Calle 13 San Victorino, Santa Fe	
Estación Central	Av. Caracas between Calle 24A and Calle 26 Santa Fe, Santa Fe	
Calle 45	Av. Caracas between Calle 42 and Calle 44 Marly, Chapinero	
Calle 63	Av. Caracas between Calle 61 and Calle 63 Lourdes, Chapinero	
Calle 72	Av. Caracas between Calle 72 and Calle 74 La Porciúncula, Chapinero	

== See also ==
- RegioTram
- Medellín Metro
- Integrated Public Transport System (Bogotá) (SITP)
