= Diablos Rojos (bus) =

Heritage bus system in Panama

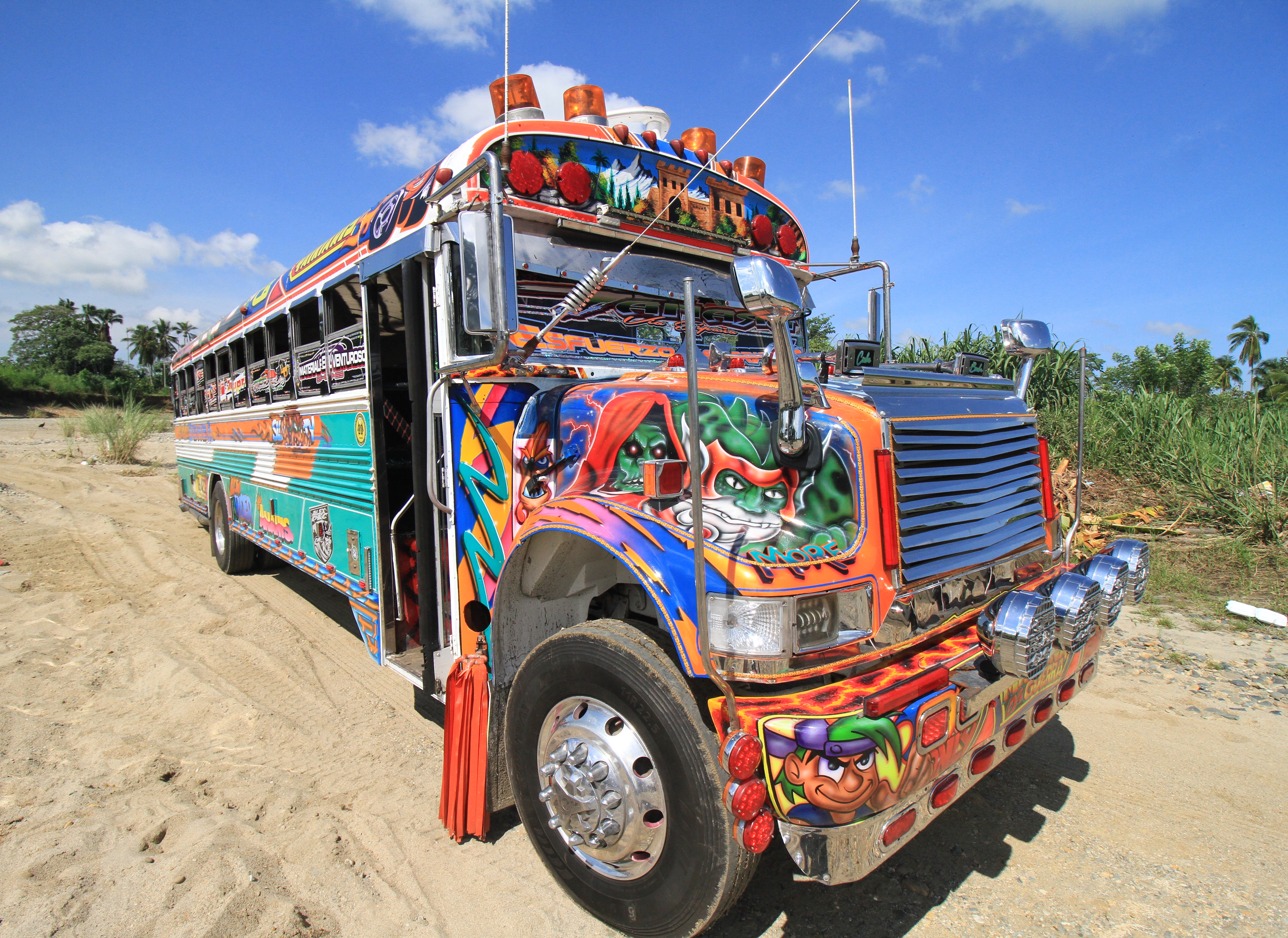
A Diablo Rojo in Pacora, Panama

A Diablo Rojo in Panama

Diablos Rojos are privately owned heritage buses that operate in and around Panama City, Panama. They are second-hand school buses imported from the United States known for their brightly painted exteriors, chrome embellishments, and loud music, and have become a symbol of Panamanian culture.

== History ==
Diablos Rojos first arrived in Panama around the 1960s as second-hand buses from the United States and served as a means of cheap transportation around the Panama Canal. When they arrived, they were typical yellow Bluebird and International school buses fitted with green leather seats inside. Once rail street cars (transvía) were completely phased out in 1940, private buses soon became Panama's main mode of transportation. In 1968, General Omar Torrijos conducted a coup d'état, and in 1973, he broke up two large public transportation companies, allowing owner-operators to compete for routes. As a progressive leader, he supported the bus drivers who were striking and demanding labor reforms. By allowing any entrepreneur to import and operate these U.S. school buses with an individual permit, the groundwork was set for Diablo Rojos to thrive. The owners of Diablos Rojos invited artists to cover the exterior in images of what best represented them. It was also a way to hide the age of the buses. These artistic expressions granted the drivers an opportunity to stand out from their competitors by catching the eye of potential passengers. Often, they would include pictures of their spouses or children on the back, along with an inspirational quote (pregones). Images ranged from characters in show business, music, cartoons, and cinema, to old glories of sports and national landmarks in Panama. The insides of these buses are also typically decorated with red leather accents along with decals with bright colors and designs. Bus drivers also often hired a person to collect fares and announce stops along their routes, known as the secre or el secretario. Initially, the Diablos Rojos were largely unregulated. Many buses lacked proper maintenance due to a lack of access to factory-issued replacement parts to keep them in good condition. Because they were a decentralized system, they also lacked firm routes and schedules, but the buses served an important purpose: they allowed poorer citizens on the outskirts of the city to find employment, transporting them to and from the city center. Their routes formed around the community they served, being often the only mass transportation option for the majority of Panamanians who did not own personal vehicles. At the time, there was no centralized public transportation system. Commuters took pride in their neighborhood bus, and strong communities of regular riders developed along their routes.

== Art ==
These buses emerged as a counter-hegemonic response to the dominant mestizo national identity promoted by the Panamanian government and lighter-skinned elites. The bus art offers a window into Afro-Panamanian culture, as the artists who work on them are usually of West Indian descent, and their art tends to celebrate Afro-Caribbean expressions and style. The buses brim with affirmations of personal pride, comparable to bumper stickers. Designed to attract attention, some of the paintings are provocative in nature. However, the Diablos Rojos assert the subaltern culture into a space that does not usually see it. The imagery used is purposefully and boldly visible.

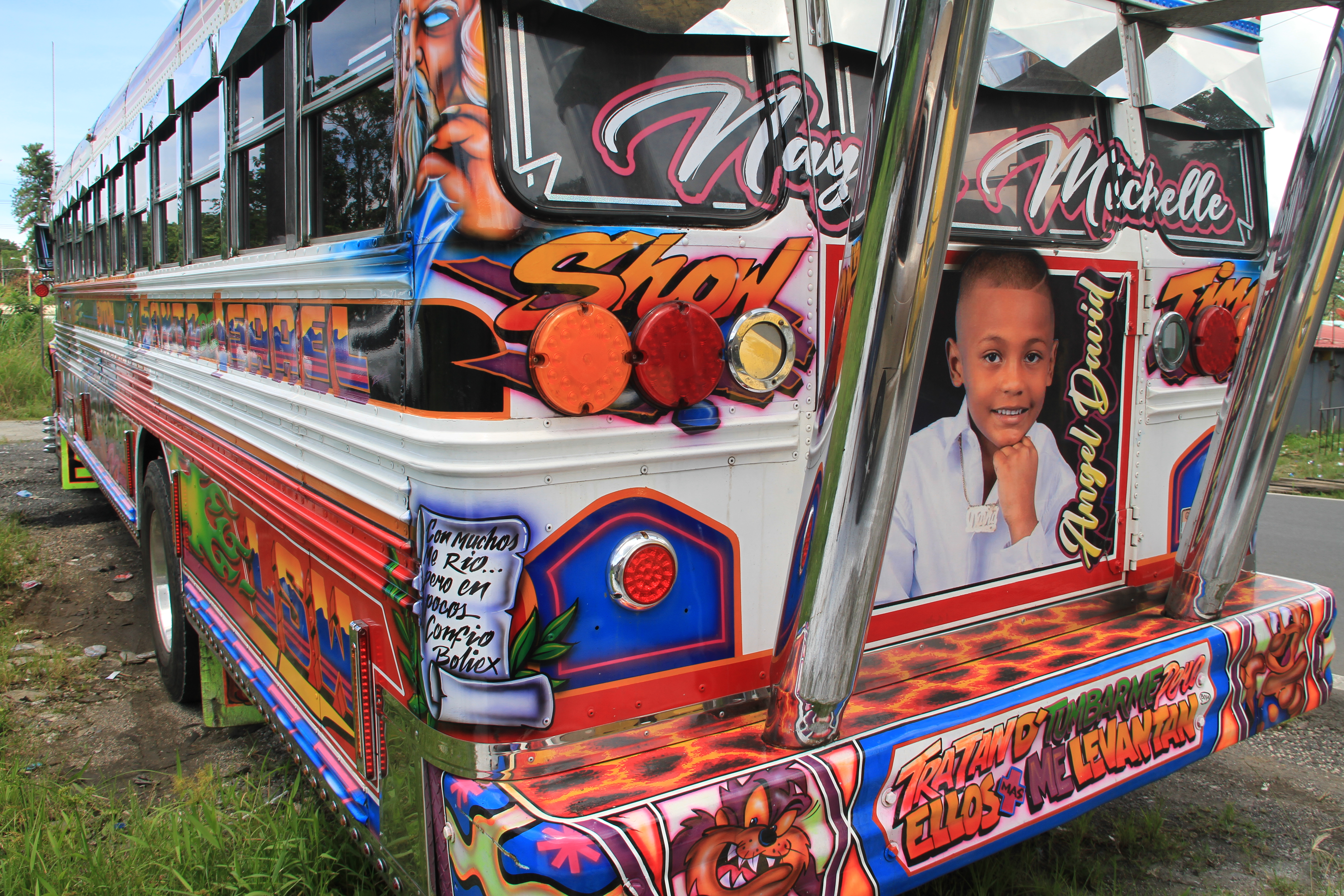
Artwork on the rear door of a Diablo Rojo

Some of the most important Diablo Rojo paintings are located on the front upper arch, the rear upper arch, and the rear exit door. The arches often include names of the driver's family, lovers, and children. One of the most common themes for these areas is ruralismo. These idealized rural landscapes, often a contrast to the loud images on the rest of the bus, nod to mestizo identity. The rear exit door is the most traditional "canvas" on a Diablo Rojo: it is a large, flat rectangle on one of the buses' most visible areas. This panel often depicts portraits, including celebrities or the driver's children.

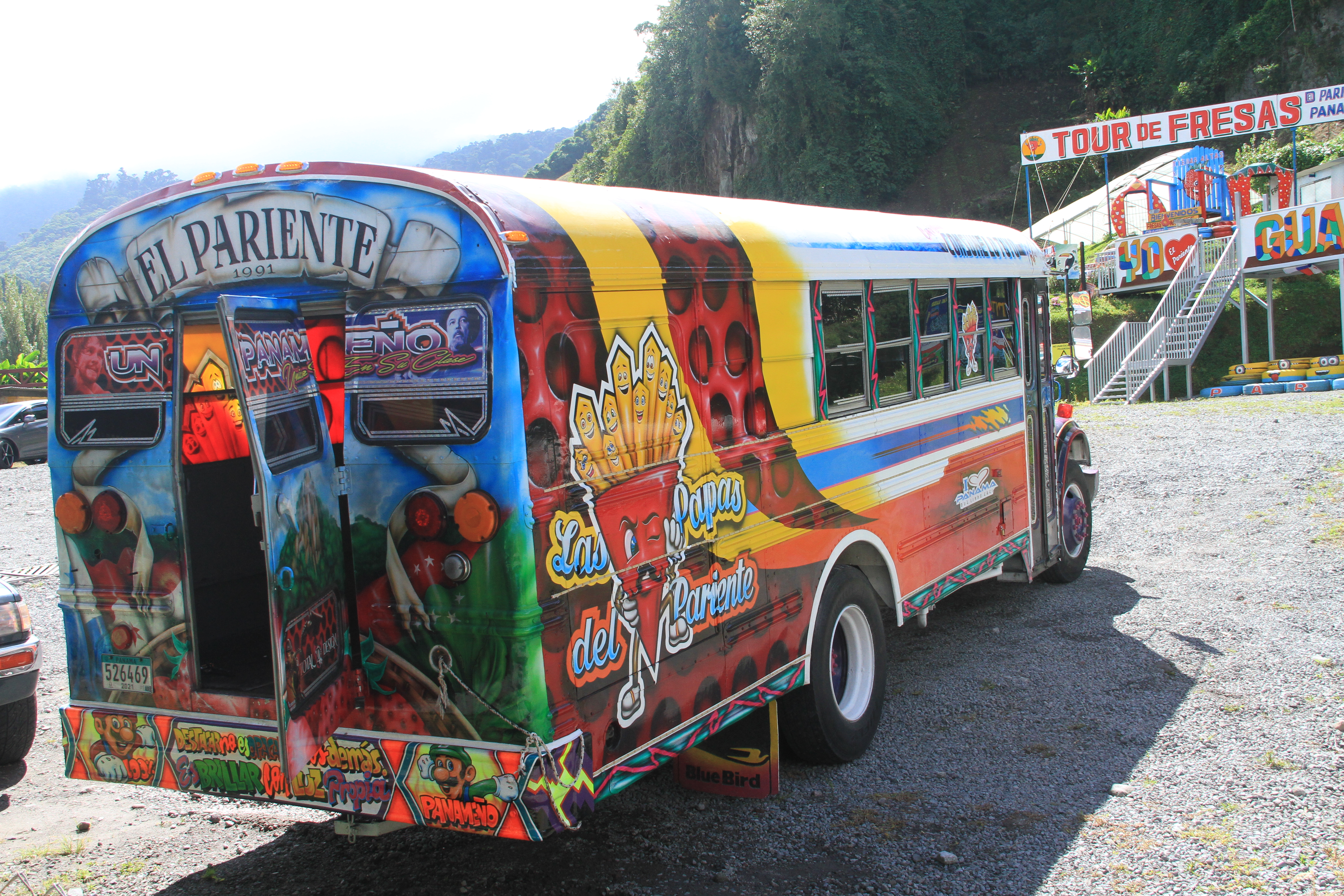
The rearview of a Diablo Rojo

The buses' interiors are also typically adorned with artwork. Airbrush painting is usually used for decoration, though ornaments such as feathers, bells, decals, lights, and others are also frequently used. For many bus drivers, the appearance of their bus is a source of pride, and they invest considerable financial resources and time to outfit their buses. Each bus represents the community it serves and therefore individual buses are highly recognizable by name from area to area. In addition to the visual culture that these buses create, the loud techno, salsa, and reggaeton music blasting from their speakers identifies them as iconic pieces of Panamanian culture that engage multiple senses. Some of the most well-known Diablo Rojo artists in Panama include Óscar Melgar, a painter with the most buses today in Panama City, Cristóbal Adolfo "Piri" Merszthal Villaverde, a self-taught artist from Pacora, and Luis "The Wolf" Evans, who is commonly credited with starting the bus painting tradition.

== Phasing out ==
In 2008, President Martin Torrijos initiated the removal of Diablos Rojos. This plan for removal was due to many accidents involving Diablos Rojos, alongside reports that the buses were too noisy and driven rashly. After drafting the "Plan de Movilidad Urbana y Modernización", it was confirmed that the state would centralize transportation with a public MetroBus system. President Torrijos' plan was to purchase four hundred Metro buses with air conditioning, safety features, comfortable seats, wheelchair accessibility, and two doors. The government would create routes that would cover both the northern and southern parts of the city. Later, Martinelli added an underground Metro to this new transportation system. Although this plan had the goal of starting in 2009, it took several years to phase out the Diablos Rojos. It was not until 2013, under President Ricardo Martinelli, that they officially stopped running within the city. As compensation for retiring their buses, Diablo Rojo owners were awarded $25,000 and some were even hired as drivers for the new MetroBus system. Following the implementation of the MetroBus, 2014 brought the Metro subway system to Panama. The trains ran seven days a week and rapidly connected the northern and eastern parts of Panama to the city.

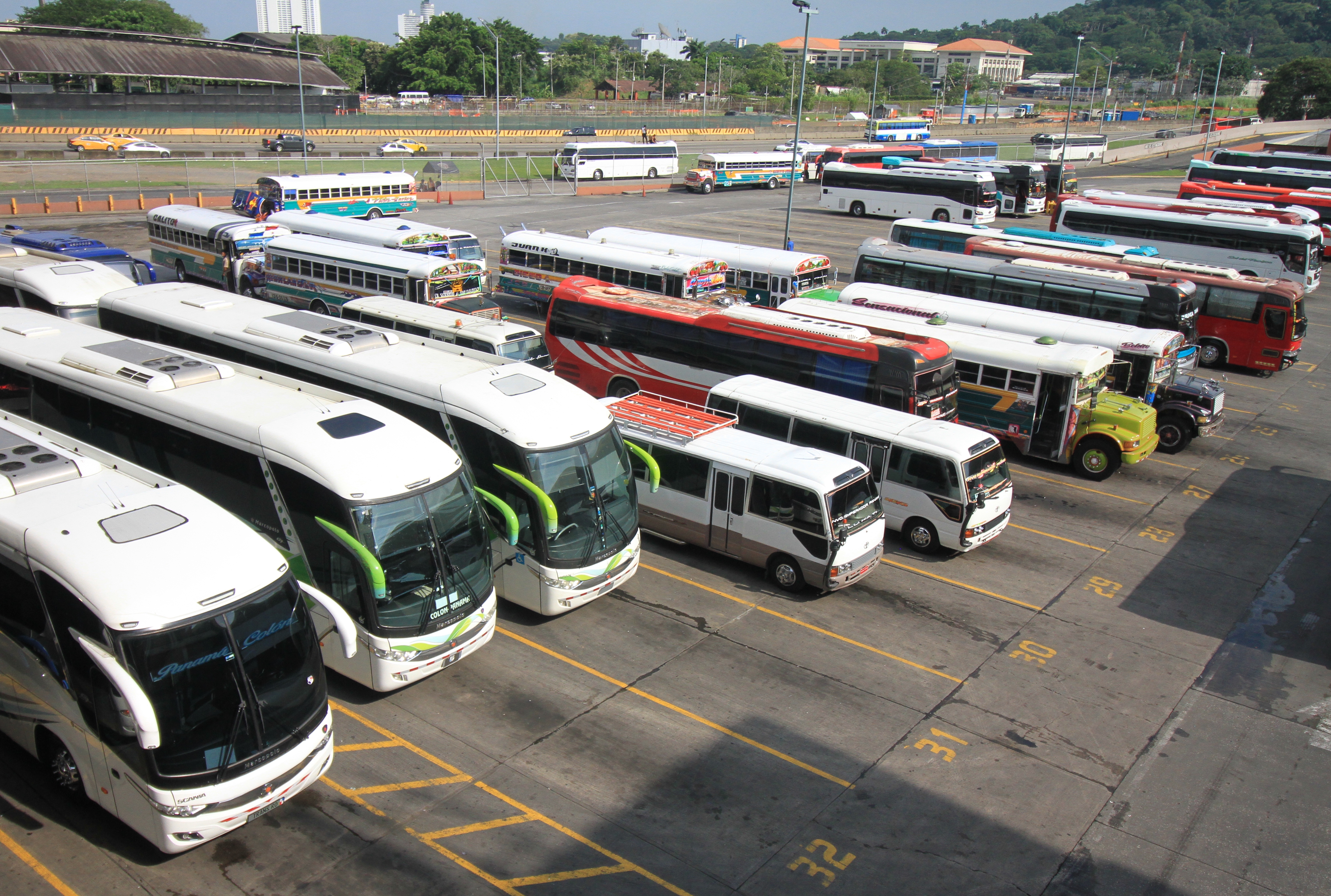
Albrook bus station near Panama City

Although some Diablos Rojos still operate in Panama City, the MetroBus and Metro are a more frequent choice today. Currently, Diablos Rojos are a more common form of transportation to satellite cities and the urban periphery, areas where the MetroBus does not serve. This includes places like Pacora, La Chorrera, and others.

== Cultural parallels ==
Panama's private buses mirror vehicles used in several other parts of the world. In the Philippines, U.S. troops abandoned war Jeeps after leaving Manila because it was not cost-effective to transport them back to the States. Many Filipinos privately adopted these vehicles, outfitting them in bright colors and charging lower fares than the city's transit system. These "Jeepneys" were the preferred form of transit for many locals. The government has made efforts to phase out Jeepneys by regulating vehicle size, capacity, and engine quality. Similarly, "Jingle Trucks", nicknamed by U.S. soldiers during the war in Afghanistan, are ornate trucks common in Pakistan. Truck art in South Asia originates back to the 1920s, when English colonization brought Bedford trucks to the region. As Pakistanis adopted these vehicles, they fitted them with their iconic wooden prow and decorated them with wooden paneling, colorful paint, and bells. The logos were originally intended to signify what the truck carried to people who could not read, but the logos became increasingly ornate over time.
