= Trams in Panama =

Operation
- Locale: Panama City & Colón
- Open: 1893
- Close: 1941 (with interruptions)
- Lines: 2

Infrastructure
- Track gauge: 3 ft 6 in (1,067 mm)
- Propulsion system: Electric
- Stock: →

Statistics
- 115,622 (1894); 141,722 (1895); 178,495 (1896)
United Electric Tramways Company era: 1893–ca.1898
- Operator: United Electric Tramways Company
- Track gauge: 3 ft 6 in (1,067 mm)
- Stock: 6 vehicles
Panama Tramways Company era: 1913–1917
- Operator: Panama Tramways Company
- Track gauge: 3 ft 6 in (1,067 mm)
- Stock: 22 vehicles
Panama Electric Company era: 1917–1941
- Owner: Ebasco
- Operator: Panama Electric Company
- Track gauge: 3 ft 6 in (1,067 mm)
- Route length: 10.6 mi (17.06 km) (1924); 11.2 mi (18.02 km) (1940)
Overview
System map (1920 - 1941)

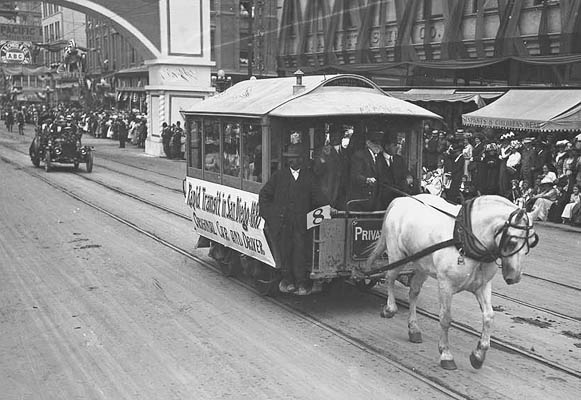
1886 Original car and driver in Panama

Trams in Panama began with an electric tramway in Panama City in 1893 and remained in service, with interruptions, until 1941. Passenger rail transport in Panama dates back to the 1850s, when the first transisthmian railroad line across Panama was beginning to be built to supply an alternate route to California in search of gold and wealth. The Panama Railroad was operating between Colón and Panama City by 1855. An attempt to build a battery operated tram network in Colón in 1910 was not successful.

== Panama City ==
On 16 May 1889, the Ministry of Public Works in Bogotá let a contract with a Colombian company to build what would have been the first street railway in Panama City. That first company failed to complete the tramway line. The contract was then bought out by foreign investors, who formed the United Electric Tramways Company in London on 22 October 1892. On 1 October 1893, the service was inaugurated on a Panama City line that was built with English financing and Siemens electrical technology along Avenida Central. It was not the very first, but was among the first few electric tramway systems built in Latin America.

The United Electric Tramway line started service just as the first major attempt to build a canal across the isthmus by the Ferdinand de Lesseps-led Société internationale du Canal interocéanique was winding down. By 1894, a second effort to build a canal under a newly formed Compagnie Nouvelle du Canal de Panama was started. The construction efforts helped boost ridership along the new tramway line. The second canal construction attempt did not succeed, and the economy of the isthmus slowed. Service along that first Panama City tramway line ended during the Thousand Days' War, which lasted from 1899 to 1902.

On 3 November 1903 the Republic of Panama declared its separation from Colombia, having previously been the Isthmus Department of Colombia. In 1904 the United States took over operations of the Compagnie Nouvelle du Canal de Panama and expanded the effort, eventually completing the Panama Canal. While canal construction was underway, on 29 October 1906 the new Panamanian government let a contract for a new tramway in Panama City. The initial attempt to build the new line failed and the contract was put up for bid once more. The contract was taken up by a person working for the United Fruit Company, who formed a new Panama Tramways Company on 9 November 1911. The Panama Tramways Company was incorporated in New Jersey, and began building a new tramway line in 1912. The new 3 ft 6 in (1,067 mm) narrow gauge line opened for service on 1 August 1913, one year before the opening of the Panama Canal. In 1914 the Panama Tramways Company was reorganized as the Panama Electric Company and the latter company was acquired by the Electric Bond and Share Company (Ebasco) on 27 September 1917. At the time, Ebasco was a holding company subsidiary of General Electric.

In 1916 an author noted that Panama City:

...has two light and power plants, a gas plant and an excellent tramway service which communicates with the towns of Ancon and Balboa on the Canal Zone, as well as with the suburban district of the Sabanas; one of the street car branches runs to the Balboa docks at the terminus of the Canal where the great steamers arrive.

— William T. Scoullar, Blue Book of Panama

Nevertheless, the new tramway was subject to a strike amidst a general strike of other workers such as garbage collectors in October 1916. Both the original United Electric Tramways Company, and the later Panama Tramways Company used equipment with entrance doors on the left since the isthmus was a drive on the left traffic area in the 19th century. Panama changed to drive on the right for road vehicles in 1943. A level junction intersection of the two track 3 ft 6 in (1,067 mm) tram line with the two track 5 ft (1,524 mm) Panama Rail Road line was constructed along Avenida Central in 1920 to avoid the need for the trams to follow a longer route around the mainline railroad that had previously gone along Avenida Norte and Calle 23 Este. At the outer end of the line in Sabanas, near Calle 62, there was a bullring with a wooden grandstand.

Tramway service on the Panama City line lasted until midnight on Saturday 31 May 1941. The contract between the company and the government had been nullified and transport service was subsequently provided by buses.

== Colón ==

The city of Colón had a horsecar tramway initially. There was then an attempt to build a battery operated, electric street railway in Colón starting in 1910, however it was reported around July 1914 in foreign press reports that work on the Colón project was suspended. The Colón battery tramway was never completed.

== 21st century ==
In 2000 a study was carried out by transit officials in Panama City and a French consulting firm on the feasibility of building a new two-line light rail transit system in the city.

But in 2010, the government of Panama announced it planned to proceed with the construction of the new Panama Metro in Panama City instead. Unlike a tramway or a light rail line, a metro uses fully grade separated tracks as opposed to the street running of a tramway. The Panama Metro opened for operation in April 2014.

== See also ==
- Rail transport in Panama
- Panama Canal Railway
- Trams in Bogotá
- List of town tramway systems in Central America
