= Integrated Public Transport System (Bogotá) =

Public transport system in Bogotá, Colombia

- Logo of SITP

Overview
- Owner: City of Bogotá
- Area served: Bogotá and Soacha
- Locale: Metropolitan Area of Bogotá, Colombia
- Transit type: Transit bus; Bus rapid transit; Gondola lift
- Number of lines: 99 BRT, 107 feeder, 345 zonal (2024)
- Number of stations: 142 BRT stations, 7531 stops
- Daily ridership: 4 million (2024)
- Annual ridership: 1.45 billion (2025)
- Headquarters: Av. El Dorado #66 - 63, Bogotá, Colombia
- Website: SITP

Operation
- Began operation: September 30, 2012; 14 years ago
- Operator: TransMilenio SA
- Character: At-grade
- Number of vehicles: 2202 BRT, 948 feeder, 7393 zonal (2024)

The Integrated Public Transport System (Spanish: Sistema Integrado de Transporte Público; SITP) is the public transport system in Bogotá, the capital and largest city of Colombia. It integrates bus rapid transit (BRT), bus and gondola lift services in the metropolitan area of Bogotá.

== History ==
=== Beginnings and tender ===
During the 2007 campaign for the election of mayor of the city, the candidate Samuel Moreno Rojas had as a campaign proposal, in addition to the construction of phase III of TransMilenio and the Bogotá Metro, the implementation of an ambitious project whose mission was to order and integrate the traditional public transport system with TransMilenio.

In October 2009 and then as mayor, Moreno announced the start of the tender of the 13 zones in which the city was divided and to which an operator and the System of Collection and Control of Information (Sirci) would be assigned. On December 18 of that same year, Javier Hernández was appointed as manager of the SITP, a position he would occupy until March 2012.

During the first four days of March 2010, the Moreno administration suffered one of the biggest crises with a transporters strike demanded their inclusion in the SITP and managing to paralyze the city. Finally, and after extensive negotiations, Moreno and the transporters agreed to include them among the bidding companies and scrap projects for the very old buses that could not enter the system, which implied a delay in the assignment of the operators. In November, all that was needed was the tender for an area.

=== Delays ===
In 2011, with all the operators assigned and waiting to sign contracts, a judge of the republic revoked the bidding process for the award of the Sirci, arguing that the process had not received sufficient attention by the control entities and that they were still missing key points to be defined in the contract that would be signed by the winning company. This delay, together with the outbreak of a corruption case of the hiring involving Mayor Moreno and senior officials of the mayor's office, would be the main reasons in the delay of the implementation of the system, which lasts until today. On June 16 of this year, it was finally possible to award the collection of fares for the system, calculated at 2.7 billion pesos per year, to the company Recaudo Bogotá S.A. with a 16-year contract.

In spite of the promises of the manager of TransMilenio during that time, Fernando Páez, that the SITP would begin operations in December 2011, due to delays in the delivery of phase III of said system, Paéz himself had to say in September that it would not be until May 2012 when the gradual implementation of routes could be initiated. On the other hand, already from this time, a problem was noticed about people's ignorance of the system and lack of pedagogy. Finally, on December 31 and after three years of delay, the mayor in charge of Bogotá, Clara López, received the works of Phase III of TransMilenio, which meant a great advance in unlocking the implementation of the system.

=== Start of operation ===
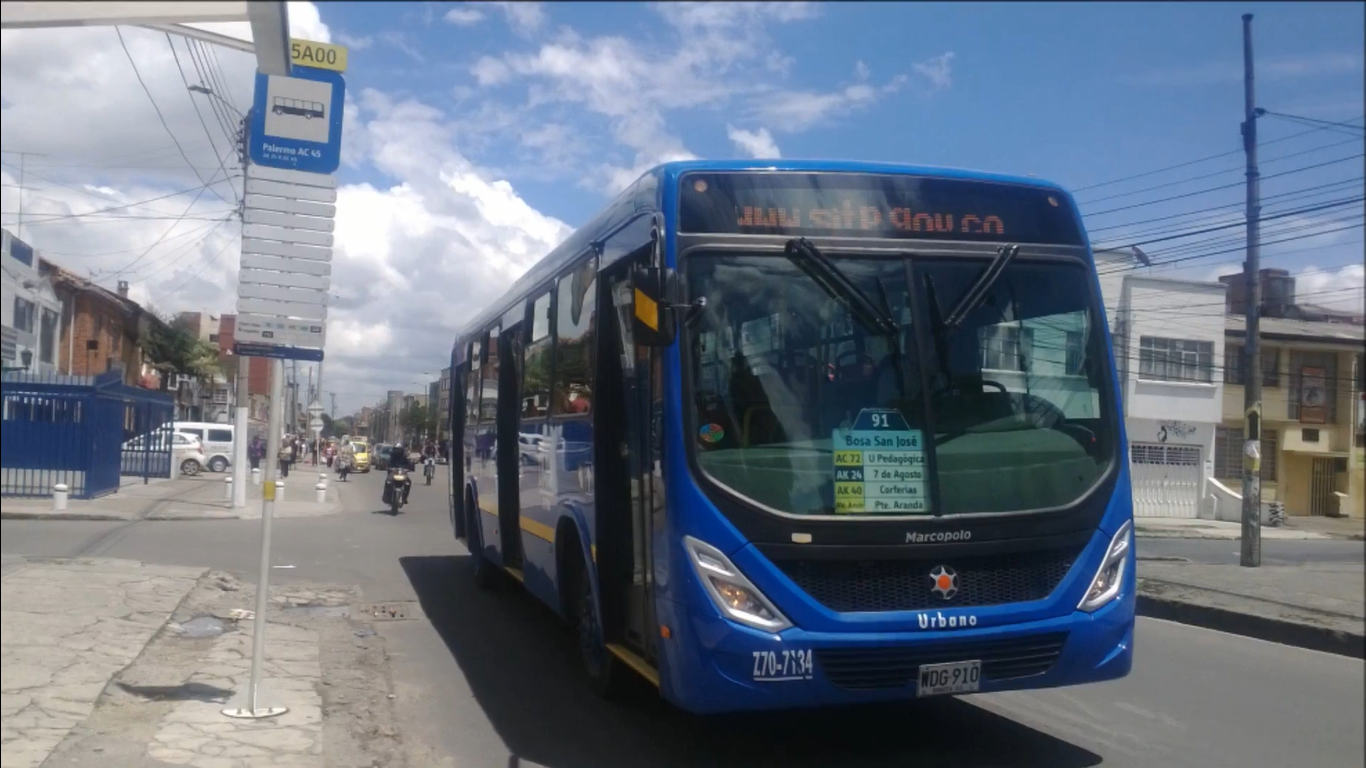
Urban service

In January 2012, with the entry of Gustavo Petro to the mayor's office and a new cabinet, it was reported that the works of phase III were incomplete and that there would still be time until the start of their operations. For this reason, it was announced that the SITP could start until June 9 of the same year. In addition, the first financial problems of the Coobus SAS operator began to be reported. who was in charge of Calle 26 and the Fontibón zone. During May of the same year, tests were begun on Phase III of TransMilenio, with satisfactory results. Despite this, the administration was unable to comply with the date given for the start of operations on the Calle 26 and Carrera 10 trunk lines.

On June 30, despite pressure from various sectors, Gobernación and El Dorado Portal stations began operation on Calle 26 for free due to delays in the implementation of the fare collection system. Finally, with a fare adjustment from July 22, the operation is gradually implemented in phase III. Immediately, another problem of the system surfaced and it is the use of two different cards, one for phase I and II and another for SITP and phase III.

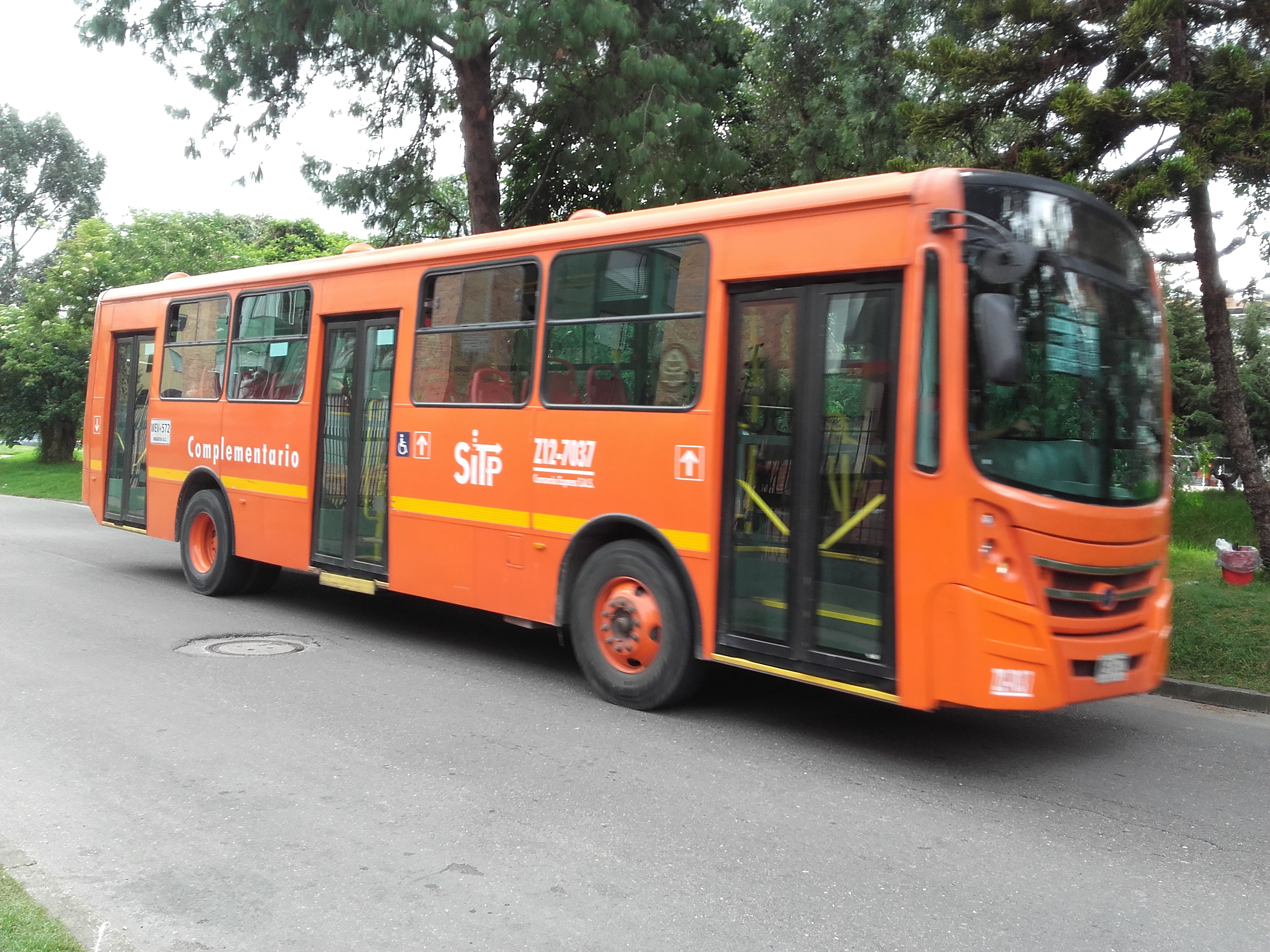
Complementary service

Although it had been said that the first urban route would begin to operate in August, it was until September 22 that two urban routes began operating in pedagogical mode. The route of one of them is from El Dorado Airport to the Andino Shopping Center and the other from Altos de Zuque to Paloquemao. Complementary routes began operation on November 1, 2012, special routes on December 1, 2012, and the traditional bus system was formally abolished on September 16, 2016, thus integrating public transport in Bogotá.

=== Accident in Usme ===
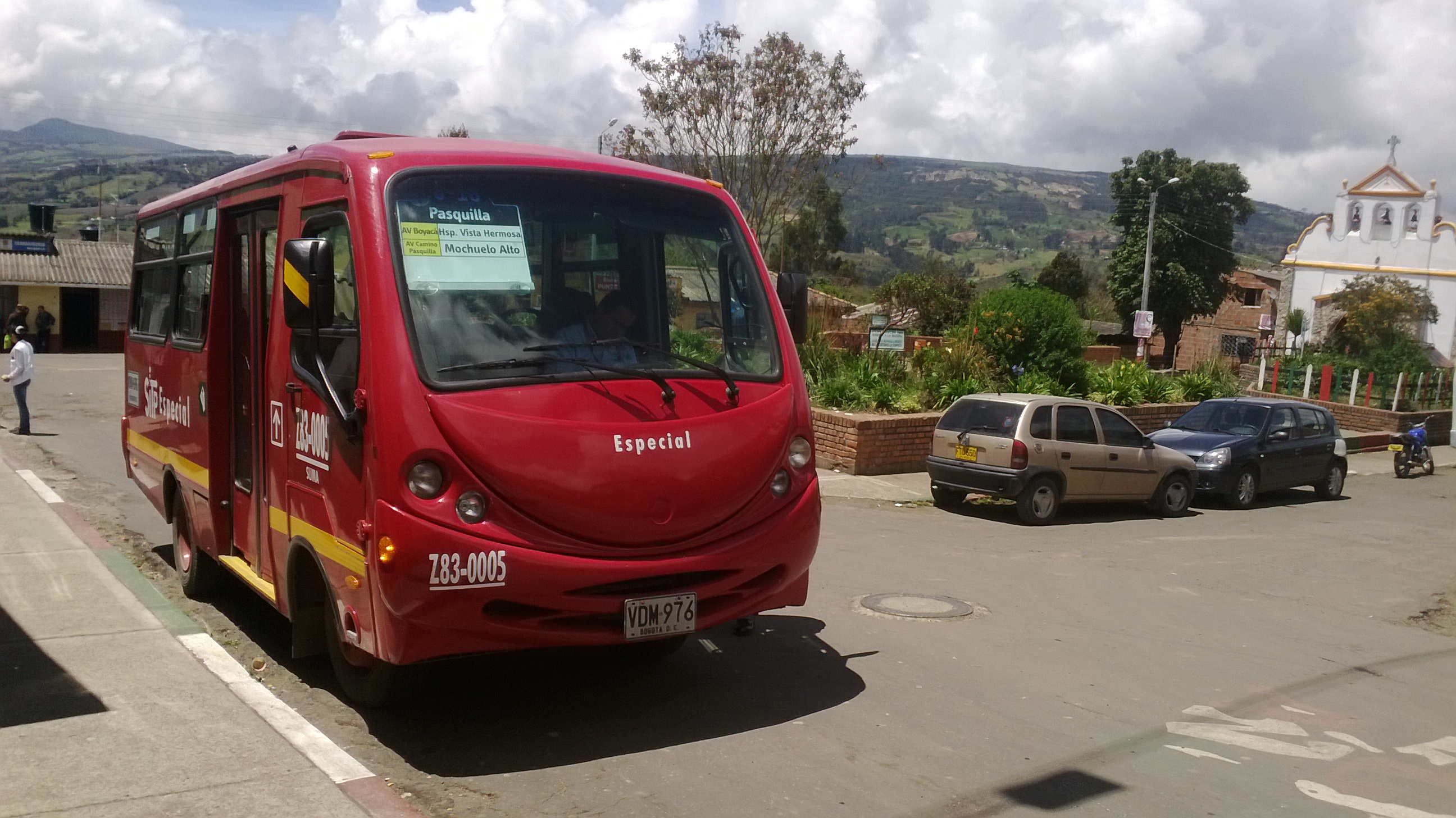
Special service

On July 10, 2013, the worst accident in the system registered to date occurred, which left 3 people dead and 19 injured. Apparently it was caused by a failure in the brakes of the automotive. According to subsequent investigations, the bus had all its revisions up to date, however, this tragic event caused a wave of control by the authorities that revealed the precarious state of the old buses used in the system.

=== Double card ===
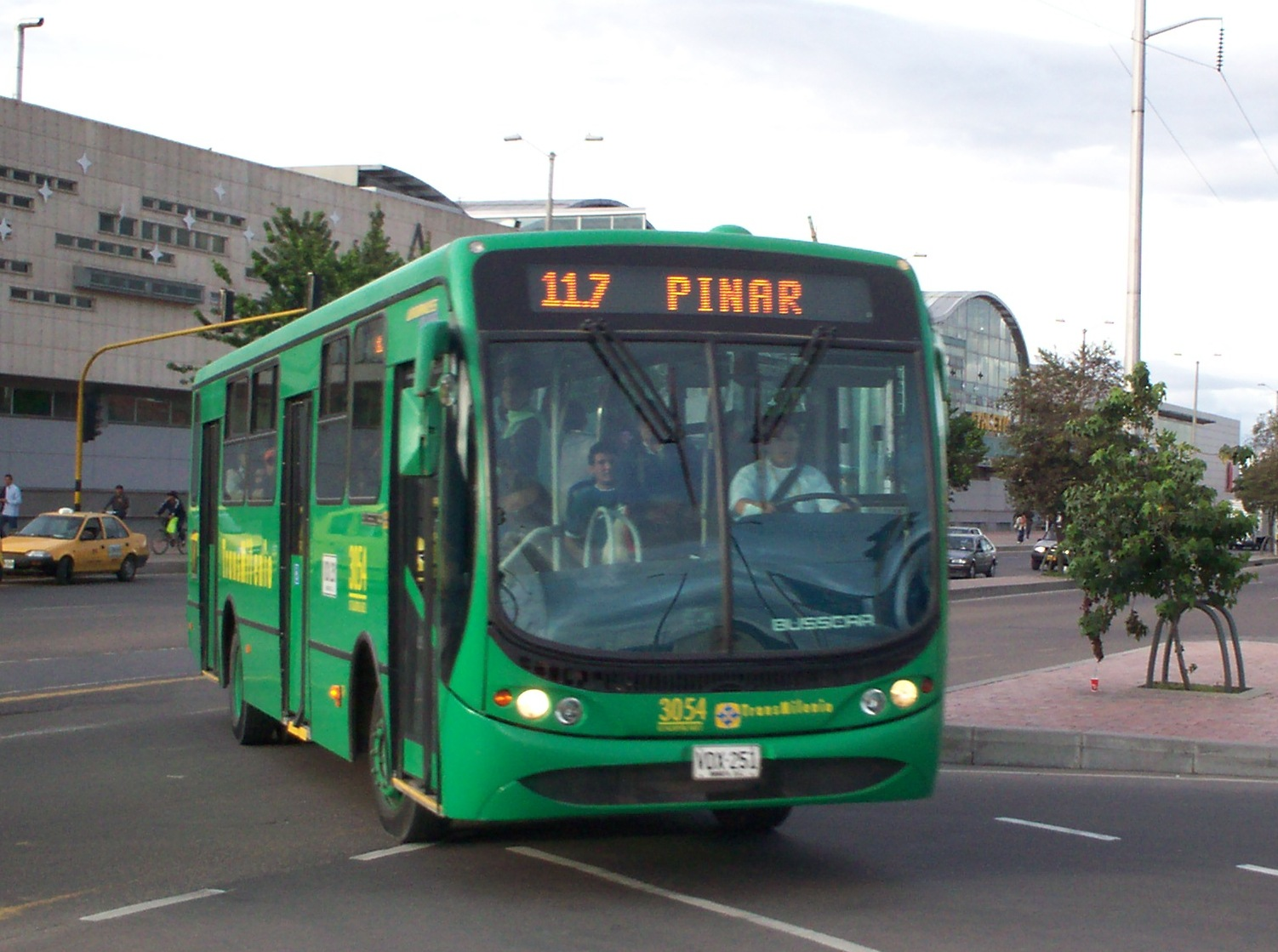
Feeder bus

Despite early warnings from the fare collection company, the SITP, including Phase III of TransMilenio, started its operation with a new card not compatible with the existing collection system in Phases I and II. In 2013, the Phase III stations were enabled to read the Phase I and II cards, and in parallel with these phases, turnstiles that read the SITP card began to be installed. From November 28, 2013, the buses of the SITP can read the cards of phase I and II. Finally, in 2015 the gradual change of the collection system began in the stations of Phases I and II, and since September of the same year all the stations of the system and the zonal buses allow the use of all the cards, which allowed the SITP to be fully integrated.

=== Rollout ===
Since the start of the system and until 2022, urban, complementary and special routes have been gradually implemented, although with serious delays with respect to the schedule. In addition, lack of contracts for the installation of stops of the zonal routes was also reported, which were awarded in August 2012 and that little by little have replaced the improvised yellow lines painted on the platform to demarcate the bus stop

Despite the slow implementation of the system, as of 2024 the zonal component has 347 routes and 7,516 bus stops throughout the city that are served by 7393 urban, complementary and special buses. After a long debate and a large number of proposals dating from mayor Moreno, it has been said that Carrera Séptima will be served by hybrid buses that would connect to TransMilenio at the National Museum station and that they would start operating by mid-December 2013.

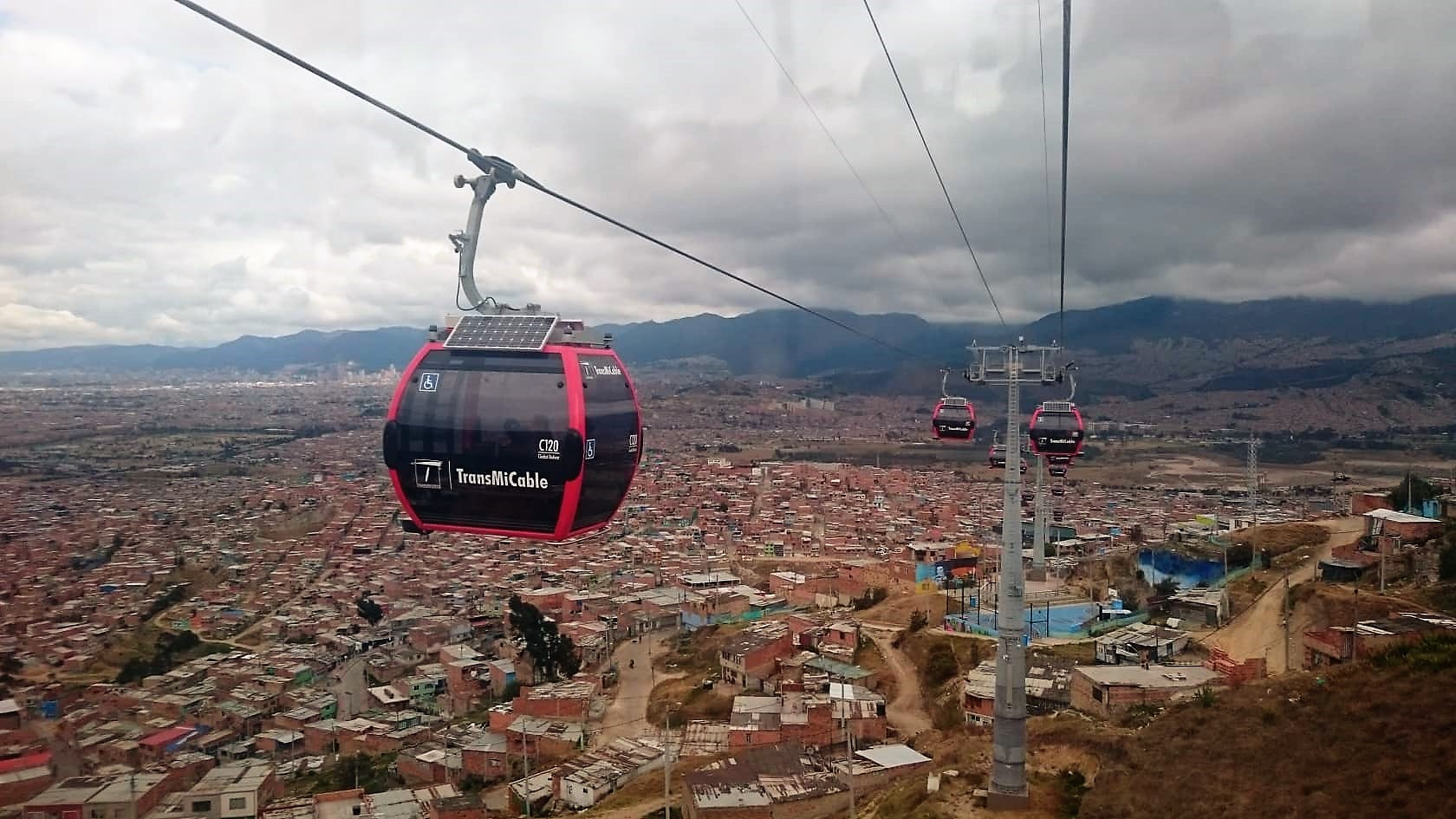
TransMiCable gondola

On the other hand, the system has been affected by serious financial problems, which imply the bankruptcy of operators Coobus S.A.S. (Fontibón zone and Calle 26 trunk line) and Egobus (Center Suba and Perdomo zones), and serious deficits due to the reduction of tariffs in mid-2012 with the implementation of the system. Despite this, the system seeks to be more accessible to the most vulnerable population and allow subsidies to those who need it most. This includes the population that is covered by the National System of Beneficiaries (SISBEN).

== Services ==
The SITP is composed of the trunk, feeder and zonal components. It has six services that fulfill a specific function, and each one is identified with the color of the vehicles: TransMiCable and trunk (red), feeder (green), urban (blue), complementary (orange) and special (maroon) buses. These last three services form the zonal component, which has a headway of 5-7 min during peak hours and 10-20 min during off-peak.

=== Trunk component ===
It is the BRT TransMilenio system included in the SITP and is a trunk-feeding system. It is identified with the color red, with variations to the front and back depending on the type of bus, which are: fully red for the articulated, yellow designs front and back for the bi-articulate and gray designs front and back for the dual buses. This service operates through exclusive lanes and stops at stations and portals located in the center of the road. In addition, the dual buses have doors for the platforms on the left side and on the right side for stops. Each route has variations and can be a regular (stops at all stations) or an express service (stops at few stations). Payment is made at the entrance to stations by means of a smart card.

Trunk lines
A Caracas	B Autopista Norte	C Avenida Suba	D Calle 80	E NQS Central	F Avenida de las Américas	G NQS Sur-Soacha	H Caracas Sur-Usme-Tunal	J Eje Ambiental	K Avenida Eldorado	L Carrera 10a	M Carrera 7a

=== Route planning tools ===
There are several applications for mobile devices and desktop to consult schedules, routes and plan the most suitable option for any route between two points of Bogota. Some of them are:

- Google Maps: web, Play Store, App Store.
- TransMi App: Transmilenio official app; web, Play Store.
- Transmilenio y Sitp: Play Store, App Store.
- MaaSapp: Play Store, App Store.
- Moovit: web, Play Store, App Store, Microsoft Store.

== Zones ==
The urban area of Bogotá is divided into 13 zones and a neutral zone, which are operated and integrated together with the current and future trunk lines of TransMilenio, Metro, TransMiCable and commuter train as follows:

Zone	Sector	Limits	Destinations
0 Neutral	Bogotá expanded center	Cl. 100; Cl. 8 S, Cl. 1 y Cl. 6; NQS; east mountains	Urban: Germania, Teusaquillo, Galerías, Marly, Palermo, Centro, Archivo Distrital, Egipto, Perseverancia, Paloquemao, Ricaurte, Chicó, Chicó Norte, Porciúncula, Lourdes, Chapinero. La Cabrera.; Complementary: Virrey, Calle 85: La Cabrera; Calle 100: Chicó Norte.; Special: Marly, Calle 63: Bosque Calderón; Marly, Calle 57: El Paraíso.
1 Usaquén	Northeast	north limit; Cl. 100; Autonorte; east mountains	Urban: Verbenal, Tibabita, Andalucía, Lijacá, Torca, La Estrellita, San Cristóbal Norte, Unicentro, Calle 182, Toberín, San Antonio Norte, La Sureña, San Luis, Santa Bárbará, Chicó, Terminal Norte, Barrancas, Calle 106, Alcalá; Complementary Terminal, Calle 187: Tibabita, Guaymaral; Toberín, Cardio Infantil: Barrancas Norte; Calle 146, Calle 142: Cedritos.; Special: Carrera 7: Unicerros, Cerro Norte, Soratama, Serrezuela, Lomitas y Capilla, Torca.; Feeder: Portal Norte: Jardines, San Antonio, Verbenal, Andalucía, Codito, San Cristóbal Norte.
2 East Suba	North	north limit; Cl. 100; Av. Suba, Cr. 76 and road to Cota; Autonorte	Urban: San Cipriano, Calle 222, Mazurén, Casablanca Norte, Colina, Jardines del Recuerdo.; Complementary: Terminal, Calle 187: Guaymaral; Toberín: Cantalejo; Mazurén, Calle 146: Cantabria; Alcalá: Colina; Prado: Canódromo, Prado.; Special: Portal Suba: Tuna Alta; Feeder: Portal Norte: Jardines, Mirandela, San José.
3 Center Suba	Northwest	Road to Cota; Salitre River and Cl. 80; Bogotá River and Av. Boyacá; Av. Suba and Cr. 76	Urban:La Gaitana, Nuevo Corinto, Villa Cindy, Lisboa, Bilbao, Villa Gloria, Suba Salitre, Corpas, Compartir, Fontanar del Río.; Complementary: Portal Suba: Chorrillos (Ruta urbana de operación circular); Feeder: Portal Suba: Avenida Suba, San Andrés, Villamaría, Aures, Avenida Cali, Las Mercedes, Pinar, La Gaitana, Lisboa, Bilbao; Granja-Carrera 77: Suba Rincón; Avenida Cali: Carrera 91.
4 Calle 80	Northwest	Salitre River and Cl. 80; Cl. 72; Bogotá River; NQS y Av. Boyacá	Urban: Cortijo, Villas de Granada, Bachué, Puente de Guadua, Gran Granada.; Complementary: Feeder: Portal 80: Álamos Norte, Garcés Navas, Villas de Granada, Cortijo, Colsubsidio, Bolivia Oriental, Quirigua, Calle 80 (Puente de Guadua), Bolivia - Bochica II. Granja - Carrera 77: Serena - Cerezos.
5 Engativá	West	Cl. 72; Cl. 26; Bogotá River; NQS	Urban: Villa Gladys, Engativá Centro, Villa Teresita, Bosque Popular, El Encanto, La Estrada, Sabana del Dorado, Engativá La Tortigua, Zona Industrial Álamos y La Florida.; Complementary: Av. Rojas: Villa Luz, Santa Helenita; Gobernación, CAN: La Esmeralda.; Feeder: Portal El Dorado: Tierra Grata, Engativá Centro, Álamos, El Muelle, Villa Amalia, La Faena; Portal de la 80: Álamos Norte, Villas del Dorado; Granja - Carrera 77: Florida. Aeropuerto Eldorado Sentido Engativá-Fontibón
6 Fontibón	West	Cl. 26; Cl. 13 and Av. Américas; Bogotá River; NQS	Urban: Terminal, Montevideo, San Pablo, El Refugio, Puente Grande, Hayuelos.; Complementary: Portal Eldorado; Belén, El Refugio (Ruta urbana de operación circular); Avenida Rojas: Modelia.; Feeder: Portal Eldorado: Fontibón Centro, Villemar, Hayuelos, Aeropuerto Eldorado, sentido Fontibón-Engativá
7 Tintal - Zona Franca	West	Cl. 13 and Av. Américas; Av. Américas and Cl. 3; Bogotá River; NQS	Urban: La Magdalena, Tintalá, Jardines de Castilla, Zona Franca, Nueva Castilla.; Feeder: Portal El Dorado: Zona Franca, La Estancia; Banderas: Castilla, Biblioteca Tintal.
8 Kennedy	Southwest	Av. Américas and Cl. 3; Av. 1° de Mayo, Cl. 56 S, Cl. 59C S and Cl. 59 S; Bogotá River; NQS and Cr. 95A	Urban: Metrovivienda, Porvenir, Palmitas, Betania, Brasilia, Brasil, Ciudad Kennedy, Villa Alexandra, Bosa Santa Fe, Tierra Buena, Riveras de Occidente, El Recreo, Jazmin Occidental, Patio Bonito, La Rivera, Mundo Aventura y Ciudad Montes.; Complementary: Mundo Aventura: Mundo Aventura.; Feeder: Portal Américas: Casa Blanca, Metrovivienda, Bosa La Libertad, Patio Bonito, Avenida Tintal, Avenida Villavicencio, Porvenir, Bosa Santa Fe, Franja Seca con los límites de la Localidad de Bosa con los Barrios Bosa Escocia y Bosa La Paz; Banderas: Kennedy Central, Corabastos.
9 Bosa	Southwest	Av. 1° de Mayo, Cl. 56 S, Cl. 59C S and Cl. 59 S; Soacha; Bogotá River and Cr. 95A; Autosur	Urban: Bosa San José, Bosa San Diego, Carbonell, Charles de Gaulle, Olarte, Villa del Río, Boita, Roma, Catalina II, San Bernardino, Potreritos, Jacqueline, Metrovivienda, Bosa Islandia, Palestina, Bosa San Pedro, Las Delicias.; Complementary: Portal Sur: Nueva Roma (Ruta urbana de operación circular).; Feeder: Portal Sur: Avenida Bosa, Bosa Centro, Albán Carbonell, Bosa Laureles, Terminal Sur, Olarte-Timiza; Portal Américas: Bosa La Independencia, Roma; Banderas: Kennedy Hospital, Timiza.
10 Perdomo	South	Cl. 8 S, Cl. 28 S; Soacha, Cl. 46 S, Cl. 70 S and Cl. 76A S; Autosur; Cr. 27, Cr 24, Cr. 25, Tunjuelo River, Cr. 45A and TV. 50	Urban: La Estancia, Tres Reyes, Galicia, Santo Domingo, Perdomo, General Santander.; Complementary: Portal Sur: Tres Esquinas (Ruta urbana de operación circular); General Santander: Madelena (Ruta urbana de operación circular); Special: Portal Sur: Cazucá.; Feeder: Portal Sur: Perdomo; Portal Tunal: Sierra Morena; General Santander: Fátima; Calle 40 Sur: Inglés.
11 Ciudad Bolívar	South	Cl. 1, Cl. 46 S, Cl. 70 S and Cl. 76A S; Cl. 28 S, Soacha, Sumapaz; Cr. 27, Cr 24, Cr. 25, Tunjuelo River, Cr. 45A and TV. 50; Cr. 14, Tunjuelo River	Urban: Mochuelo Bajo, Las Acacias, Paraíso, Alpes, Arabia, San Carlos, Quintas del Sur, Verbenal del Sur, Arborizadora Alta, Restrepo.; Special: Portal Tunal: Pasquilla; Paraíso-Illimaní: Bella Flor, Quiba.; Feeder: Portal Tunal: Candelaria, San Francisco, Paraíso, Arabia, Tesoro, Juan José Rondón, San Joaquín, Vista Hermosa, Arborizadora Alta, Villa Gloria; Calle 40 Sur: Tunal and Inglés.; TransMiCable: Portal Tunal: Juan Pablo II, Manitas and Paraíso.
12 Usme	Southeast	Cl. 1, Cl. 90 S, Ciudad Bolívar; South limit; Cr. 14, Tunjuelo River; Cr. 10, Entrenubes park, east limit	Urban: El Uval, Usme Centro, Usme Pueblo, La Fiscala, Diana Turbay, Providencia Alta, Lomas, La Resurrección, El Tuno, Cerros de Oriente, Portal Usme.; Complementary: Avenida 1° de Mayo, Country Sur: Diana Turbay-Lomas, Marruecos, Las Paces.; Feeder: Portal Usme: La Aurora, Santa Librada, Chuniza, Alfonso López, Usminia, Danubio, Avenida Caracas, Virrey, Marichuela, Usme Centro, La Fiscala, Nebraska; Portal 20 de Julio: Resurrección; Molinos: Bochica, Diana Turbay, Molinos II; Calle 40 Sur: Uribe Uribe.
13 San Cristóbal	East	Cl. 6; Cl. 90 S; Cr. 10, Entrenubes park; east limit	Urban: Altos del Zuque, Tihuaque, 20 de Julio, Canadá Guira, Juan Rey, Libertadores, Aguas Claras, San Cristóbal Sur, San Blas, La Roca, Alpes, Horacio Orjuela, Laches, El Dorado, San Rafael Sur Oriental, Doña Liliana.; Complementary: Avenida 1° de Mayo: Ramajal, Horacio Orjuela, San Cristóbal, Bello Horizonte (Ruta urbana de operación circular); Bicentenario: Las Cruces, Girardot, Laches, La María, San Cristóbal; Portal 20 de Julio: Altamira (ruta urbana de operación circular).; Special: Avenida 1° de Mayo: Sidel; Bicentenario: El Verjón.; Feeder: Portal 20 de Julio: Juan Rey, Península, Tihuaque, Villa del Cerro, Libertadores.
14 Soacha	Soacha	Bogotá; Sibaté	Urban: Circular San Mateo

== Operators ==
They correspond to the trunk bus system and zonal buses, that is, the special, complementary, urban buses and also the TransMilenio feeder buses.

Operator	Address	Fleet	Trunk or SITP zone
Ciudad Móvil S.A.	Calle 183 #51-65	Series A (trunk) 185 buses	A Caracas B Autonorte H Tunal
Transmasivo S.A.	Avenida Suba by Avenida Ciudad de Cali Portal de Suba	Series S 221 buses	C Av. Suba
Express del Futuro S.A.	Calle 80 #96-91	Series M 193 buses	D Calle 80
Connexion Móvil S.A.	Calle 57Q sur # 65-64 Portal del Sur	Series B 211 Buses	E NQS Central G NQS Sur
Somos K S.A. (SI 02 S.A.)	Avenida Ciudad de Cali # 45-57 sur Portal de las Américas	Series K 171 buses	F Av. Américas J Eje Ambiental
Metrobús S.A.	Avenida Boyacá # 59-65 Sur Portal del Tunal	Series T 140 buses	H Tunal
SI 99 S.A. (SI 03 S.A.)	Calle 67A bis sur # 14 A-35 Portal de Usme	Series U 255 buses	H Usme
Gmóvil S.A.S.	Calle 25G # 96H-28 Portal El Dorado	Series E (trunk) 124 buses Series E (Dual) 55 buses Series E02XX and E05XX (feeder) 100 buses Series Z50 (zonal) 862 buses Series Z52 (zonal) 15 buses	K SITP Engativá
Consorcio Express S.A.S.	Calle 32 sur # 3C-08 Portal 20 de Julio	Series D (trunk) 184 buses Series D (Dual) 100 buses Series N (trunk) 135 buses Series N (Dual) 130 buses Series D08XX and D09XX (feeder) 140 buses Series N08XX (feeder) 45 buses Series Z10 (zonal) 1400 buses Series Z12 (zonal) 107 buses Series Z13 (zonal) 555 buses Series Z15 (zonal) 1425 buses Series Z17 (zonal) 75 buses Series Z18 (zonal) 10 buses	L Carrera 10ª M Carrera 7ª SITP San Cristóbal SITP Usaquén
Este es Mi Bus S.A.S	Transversal 94L # 80-53	Series Z40 (zonal) 720 buses Series Z45 (zonal) 400 buses Series Z47 (zonal) 20 buses Series CO-05 y CO-06 (feeder) 95 buses Series TZ-1XX (feeder) 25 buses	SITP Calle 80 D Calle 80 SITP Tintal-Zona Franca F Av. Américas
Masivo Capital S.A.S	Calle 26 # 59-51 T. 3 Of. 504	Series Z20 (zonal) 310 buses Series Z22 (zonal) 11 buses Series Z23 (zonal) 10 buses Series Z25 (zonal) 1000 buses Series Z27 (zonal) 20 buses Series KE-0XX to KE-2XX (feeders Kennedy) 152 buses. Series SO-01XX (feeders Suba) 22 buses	SITP Kennedy F Av. Américas SITP Suba-Oriental B Autonorte
SUMA S.A.S	Carrera 17 # 70-31 sur	Series Z80 (zonal) 535 buses. Series Z83 (zonal) 9 buses Series BC-00XX to BC-02XX (feeder) 110 buses	SITP Ciudad Bolívar H Tunal H Usme
ETIB S.A.S	Autopista Sur by Carrera 64	Series Z70 (zonal) 1400 buses. Series BO-01XX (feeder) 90 buses.	SITP Bosa G NQS Sur
Tranzit S.A.S	Calle 6 sur # 15A-24	Series Z90 (zonal) 690 buses. Series US-00XX to US-02XX (feeder) 185 buses.	SITP Usme H Usme
Unión Temporal Alcapital Fase II	Grupo Express subsidiaries		feederr Suba
Unión Temporal Alnorte Fase II	Grupo Express subsidiaries		feeders North
Coobus	Defunct	Series F (trunk) 50 buses. Series F06XX (feeder) 50 buses. Series Z60 (zonal) 110 buses.	SITP Fontibón
Egobus	Defunct	Series Z30 (zonal) 70 buses. Series Z35 (zonal) 85 buses. Series Z38 (zonal) 12 buses.	SITP Suba Centro SITP Perdomo

== Fleet ==
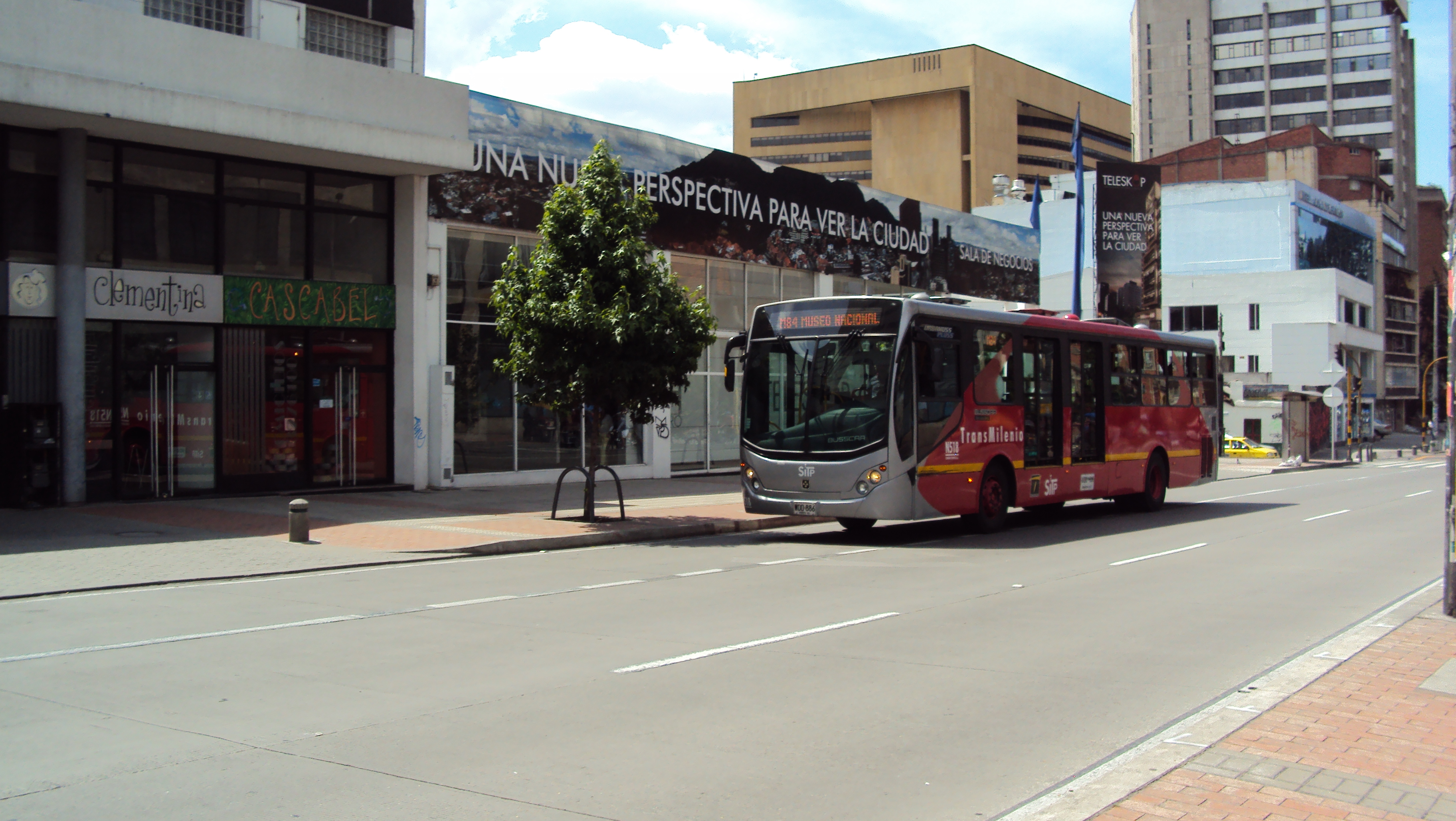
Transmilenio dual use bus

SITP and its predecessor agencies have ordered buses from a variety of manufacturers over the years, including GMC, Flxible, Scania, Mercedes-Benz, Chevrolet, Volkswagen, Volvo, New Flyer Industries, El Dorado National, Orion Bus Industries, Thomas Built Buses, Blue Bird Corporation, and North American Bus Industries (NABI). SITP has the second largest bus fleet in Latin America with 9,339 buses.

== See also ==
- Bogotá Metro
- TransMilenio
