= Trams in Bogotá =

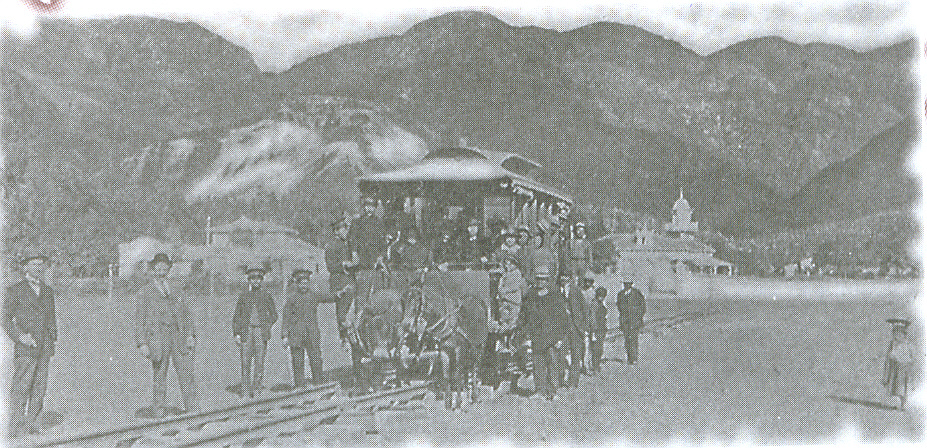
Tramway in Bogotá, 1884

Trams in Bogotá were first inaugurated on December 24, 1884 with the first tramway pulled by mules, covering the route from Plaza de Bolívar to San Diego, in Bogotá, Colombia. In 1892, a tramline linking Plaza de Bolívar and Estación de la Sabana started operating. The original trams ran over wooden rails but since such tramways easily derailed, steel rails imported from England were later installed. In 1894, a tramcar ran on the Estación de la Sabana to Chapinero line every twenty minutes.

In 1910, the system was electrified. The electric system was expanded and operated four lines.

The riots of April 1948, known as Bogotazo, caused the destruction of several tram vehicles. Bogotá's tramway provided services up to 1951 when all trams were replaced by trolleybuses on June 30, 1951.

== Aerial tramway ==
The aerial tramway or cable car to Monserrate mountain began its construction on August 13, 1953 and was inaugurated on September 27, 1955; in a bicable modality with two cabins that transport 40 passengers each. It was built in 1955, and has two cabins each for 40 passengers. The 880 m (2,887 ft) journey is traveled in 7 minutes, traveling over the downtown of the city. At the terminus on Monserrate mountain, there is a church, a restaurant and other smaller tourist attractions.

== Funicular ==
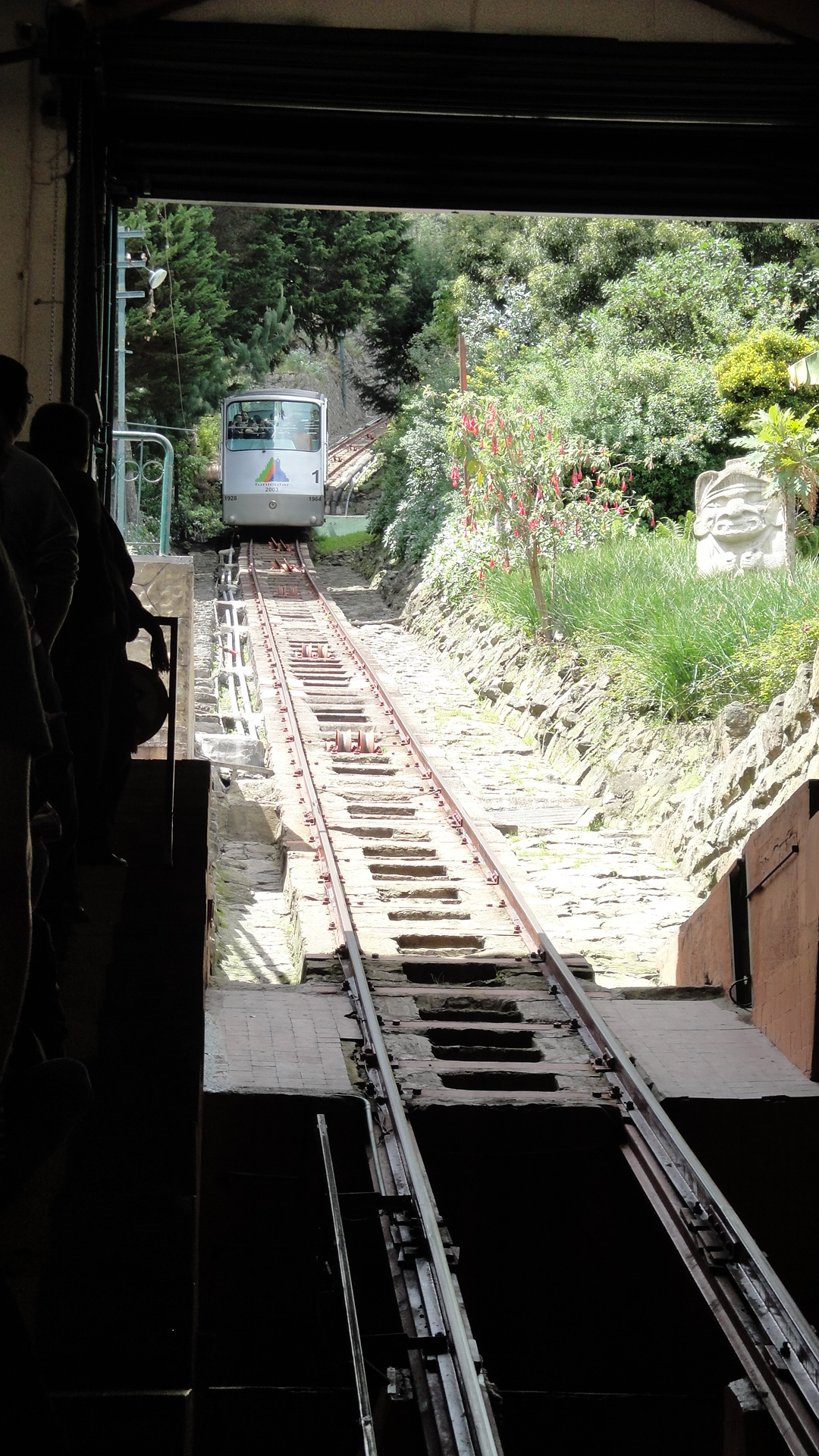
Funicular car approaching the lower station; January 25, 2011

The Funicular to Monserrate is a tramway used for going from the city level (2,962 m or 9,718 ft above sea level) to the top of the Hill of Monserrate (3152 m). The 1,000 mm (3 ft 3 3/8 in) gauge funicular transports daily the inhabitants of the capital and tourists; it was finished in 1928 and inaugurated officially on August 18, 1929. Since that time, this small train has slowly ascended towards the peak of Monserrate, gradually allowing its passengers the contemplation of nature and landscape that is being left behind as they reach the 3,152 meters or 10,341 ft above sea level, where its upper station lies.

In December 2003, the funicular initiated a new phase with a more modern design in its cars, that now open their doors to the sky with a crystal ceiling, so that nobody can lose a single detail of the forests that surround the city, the beautiful panoramic view and beautiful sunsets. In its trip of only 4 minutes, the cable car rises with its big windows on its sides, offering a great view of the hill that makes contrast with the beautiful panoramic of the city. The dense vegetation of the high trees tops leave us a sensation of direct bonding between earth and sky.

== Regiotram ==
In 2014, there was a feasibility study to create a tram-train route to serve the western suburbs of Bogotá running from Facatativá to Bosa via El Dorado International Airport. The proposed line was to be 63 kilometres (39 mi) long with an estimated cost of two billion pesos.

By 2026, the line was under construction. The line would run between Facatativá, Madrid, Mosquera, Funza and the capital, and would be implanted in phases. The first phase between Facatativá y Fontibón would be opened in 2027. A second phase, to be completed in 2029, would extend the line to Calle 26 where there would be a connection to the Bogotá Metro at Avenida Caracas.

== See also ==
- Bogotá Metro
- Bogotá Savannah Railway
- Trams in Panama
