= Avenida El Dorado (TransMilenio) =

Bus stop in Bogotá, Colombia

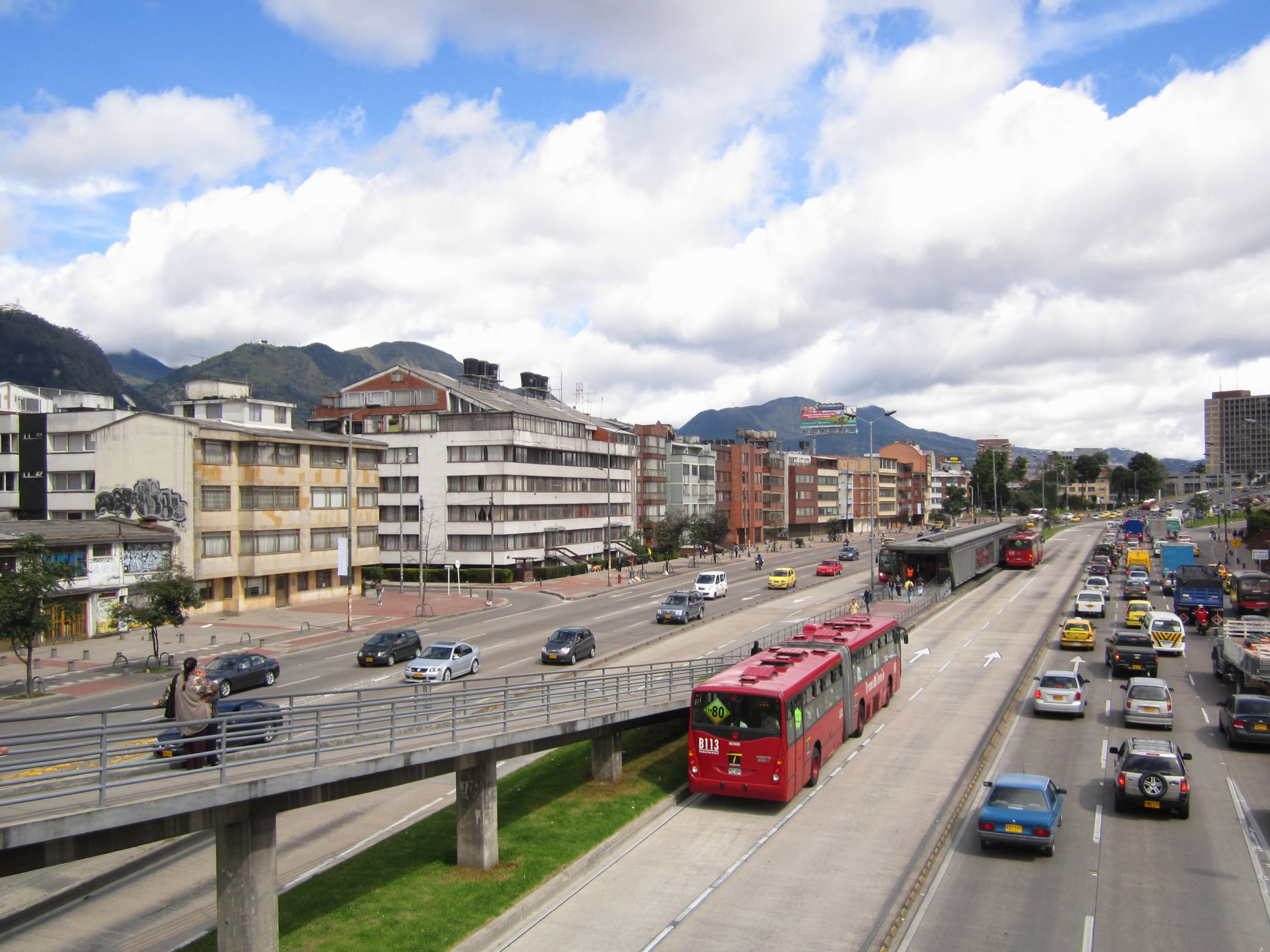

General information
- Location: Avenida NQS with Carrera 36; Teusaquillo; Colombia

History
- Opened: 2005

Services
Preceding station	TransMilenio	Following station
CAD towards La Castellana	E	Universidad Nacional towards Tygua - San José
Terminus	K	Ciudad Universitaria towards Portal Eldorado
Location

The simple station Avenida El Dorado is part of the TransMilenio mass-transit system of Bogotá, Colombia, opened in the year 2000.

== Location ==
The station is located north of downtown Bogotá, specifically on Avenida NQS with Carrera 36.

== History ==
This station opened in 2005 as part of the second line of phase two of TransMilenio construction, opening service to Avenida NQS. It serves the demand of Calle 26 and the Palermo district.

In early 2024, the services on Avenida El Dorado were affected by protests.

== Station services ==
=== Old trunk services ===
Services rendered until April 29, 2006
Kind	Routes	Frequency
Current		Every 3 minutes on average
Express	Expreso 150	Every 2 minutes on average

=== Trunk services ===
Services provided since July 23, 2012
Kind	Routes to the North	Routes to the South	Routes to the West
Easy route	4 7	4 7	
Express Monday to Saturday all day	B12	G12	
Express Monday to Friday all day	B16		K16
Express on Sundays and holidays	B90	G90	

=== Dual services ===
Services provided since September 6, 2014
Kind	Routes to the North	South Routes
Dual weekends (large fairs) all day	E76	E76

=== Feeder routes ===
This station does not have connections to feeder routes.

=== Inter-city service ===
This station does not have inter-city service.

== See also ==
- List of TransMilenio Stations
