= Simón Bolívar (TransMilenio) =

7 de Agosto
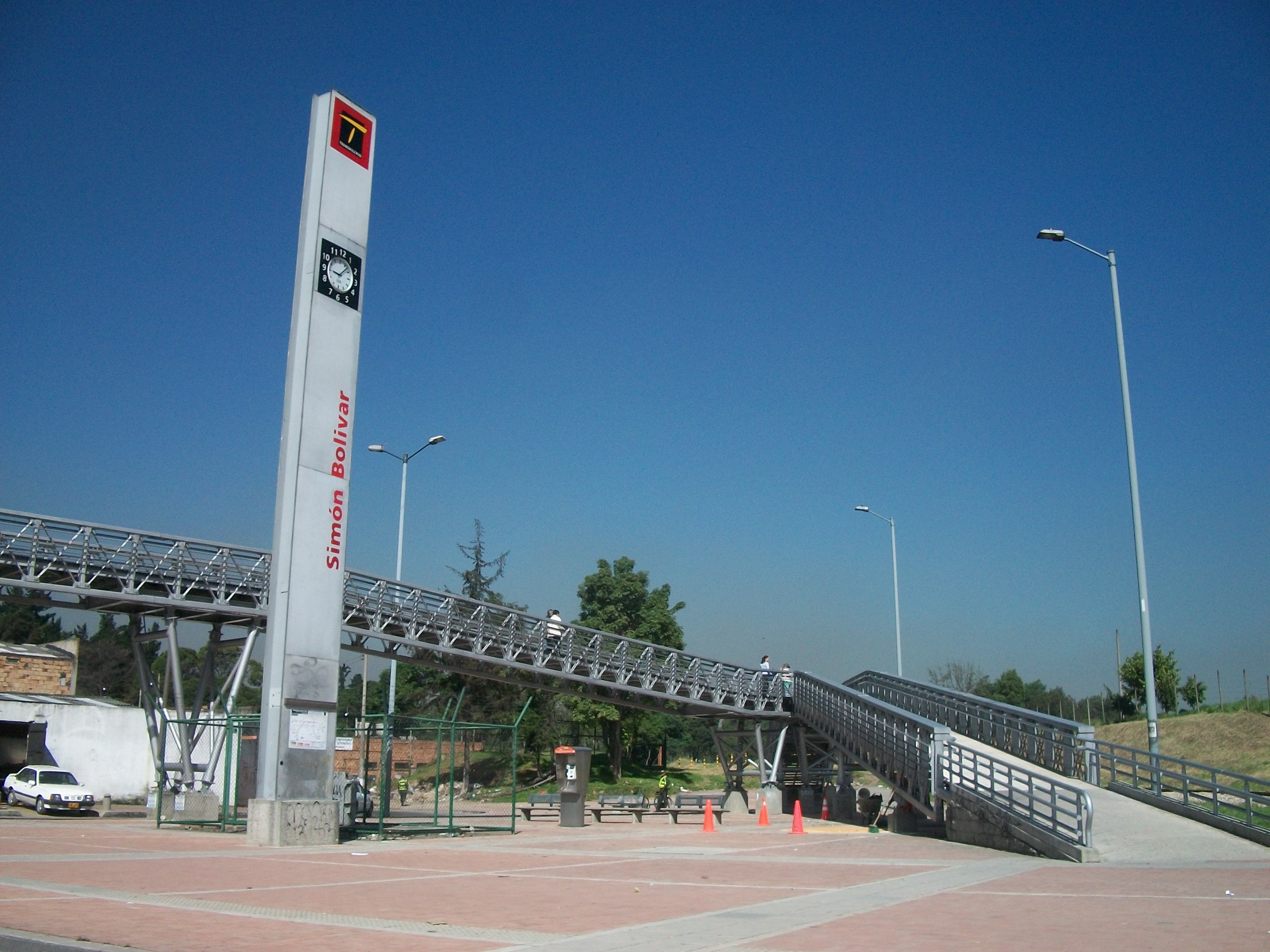

General information
- Location: Avenida NQS with Calle 63 G Barrios Unidos, Bogotá; Colombia

History
- Opened: 2005

Services
Preceding station	TransMilenio	Following station
Avenida Chile towards La Castellana	E	Movistar Arena towards Tygua - San José
Location

7 de Agosto is a simple-station that is part of the TransMilenio mass-transit system of Bogotá, Colombia.

== Location ==
7 de Agosto is located north of downtown Bogotá, specifically on Avenida NQS with Calle 63 G.

== History ==
This station opened in 2005 as part of the second line of phase two of TransMilenio construction, opening service to Avenida NQS. It serves the demand to the eastern entrance of Parque Simón Bolívar and the surrounding areas.

== Station services ==
=== Old trunk services ===
Services rendered until April 29, 2006
Kind	Routes	Frequency
Current		Every 3 minutes on average
Express	Expreso 160	Every 2 minutes on average

=== Trunk services ===
Services provided since July 23, 2012
Kind	Routes to the North	Route to the South	Routes to the West
Easy route	4 7	4 7	
Express Monday to Saturday all day	B12	G12	
Express Monday to Friday peak rush hour	E32		
Express Monday to Friday afternoon peak hour			F32
Express Monday to Saturday rush morning and afternoon	B28		F28
Routes that finish in the station
Express Monday to Saturday all day	E44		
Routes that start in the station
Express Monday to Saturday all day	G44		

=== Feeder routes ===
This station does not have connections to feeder routes.

=== Inter-city service ===
This station does not have inter-city service.

== See also ==
- List of TransMilenio Stations
