= Campín =

Transit station in Bogotá, Colombia

Coordinates: 4.6453°N 74.0787°W

El Campín - Universidad Antonio Nariño
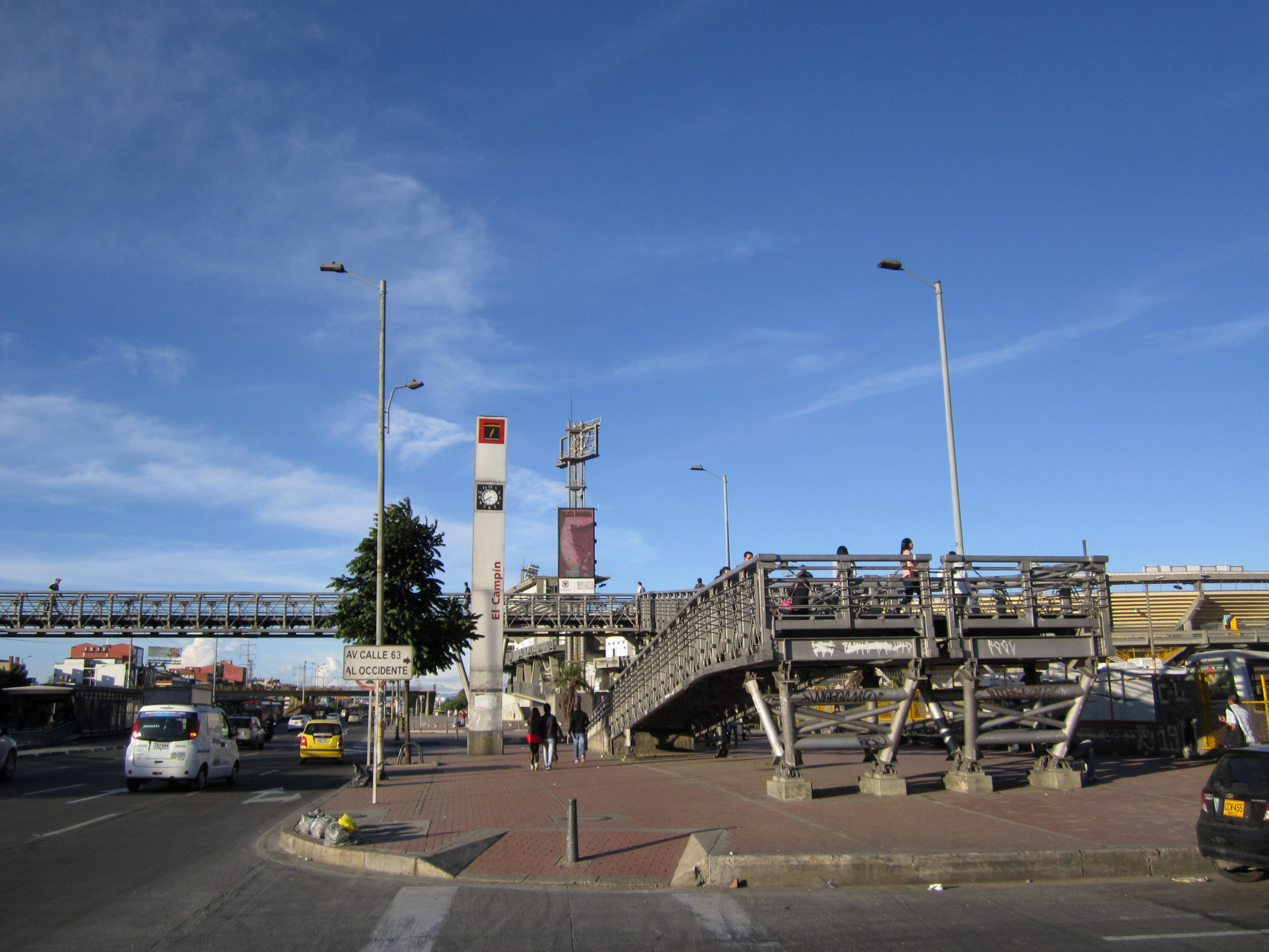

General information
- Location: Avenida NQS with Calle 53B; Teusaquillo, Bogotá; Colombia

History
- Opened: 2005

Services
Preceding station	TransMilenio	Following station
Movistar Arena towards La Castellana	E	Universidad Nacional towards Tygua - San José
Location

The simple-station Campín is part of the TransMilenio mass-transit system of Bogotá, Colombia, opened in the year 2005.

== Location ==
Campín is located north of downtown Bogotá, specifically on Avenida NQS with Calle 53B.

== History ==
This station opened in 2005 as part of the second line of phase two of TransMilenio construction, opening service to Avenida NQS. It serves the Estadio El Campín—from which it gets its name—and the surrounding neighborhoods.

== Station Services ==
=== Old trunk services ===
Services rendered until April 29, 2006
Kind	Routes	Frequency
Current		Every 3 minutes on average
Express	Expreso 130	Every 2 minutes on average

=== Trunk services ===
Services provided since July 23, 2012
Kind	Routes to the North	South Routes
Local	4 7	4 7
Express Monday to Saturday all day	B11	G11
Express Monday to Friday morning and afternoon peak hours	C30	G30
Express Saturdays from 5:00 a.m. At 3:00 p.m.	C30	G30
Express on Sundays and holidays	B90 C96	G90 G96

=== Feeder routes ===
This station does not have connections to feeder routes.

=== Inter-city service ===
This station does not have inter-city service.

== See also ==
- Bogotá
- TransMilenio
- List of TransMilenio Stations
