= Concejo de Bogotá (TransMilenio) =

Transmilenio station

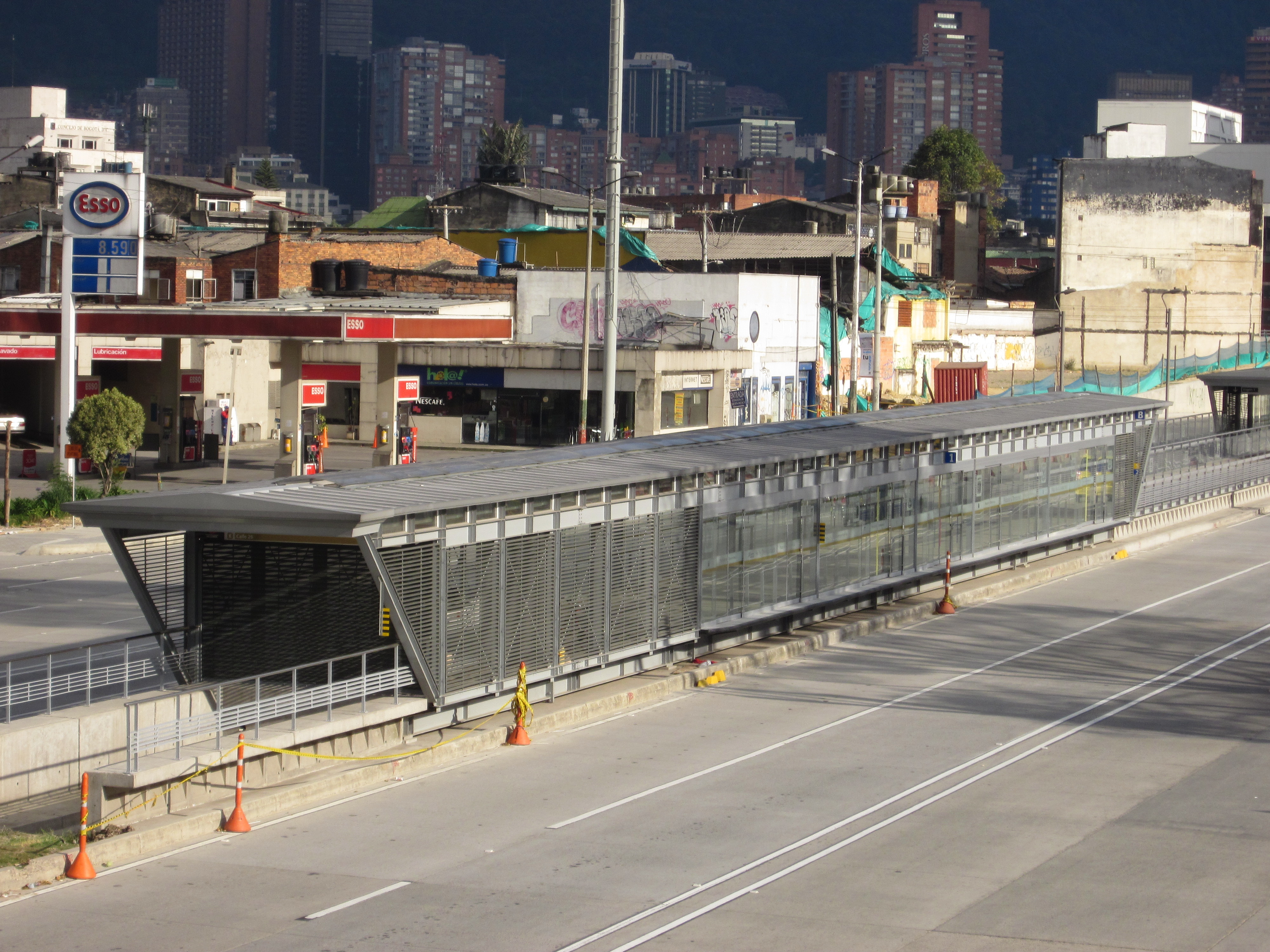

General information
- Location: Av.Calle 26 with Av.Carrera 30; Teusaquillo, Bogotá; Colombia

History
- Opened: September 29, 2012

Services
Preceding station	TransMilenio	Following station
Centro Memoria towards Universidades	K	Ciudad Universitaria towards Portal Eldorado

Concejo de Bogotá is a station that is part of the mass transit system TransMilenio.

== Location ==
It is located on the Avenue El Dorado between the 37th and the Avenida NQS. It is accessed through a pedestrian bridge located on NQS Avenue.

Serves the demand of the neighborhoods the Soledad, the Americas, Great America and its surroundings.

Nearby are the District Administrative Center (CAD), SupeCADE CAD and the Bogota Council.

== Etymology ==
The station receives its name because it is located near the establishment of the council of Bogotá, it is also next to the Plaza de la Democracia, located east of the station to which it is located in the depression that passes along 26th Street below the Avenue of the Americas. Before 2010, 26th Street passed through a bridge that was demolished to make way for the plaza and the depressed.

In this area of public space is located the monument Ala Solar of the Venezuelan Alejandro Otero.

From September 2018, it was renamed the Concejo de Bogotá.

== History ==
This station is part of Phase III of TransMilenio, which began to be built in late 2009 and, after several delays related to corruption cases, was delivered in mid-2012.

=== Current Trunk Services ===
Service as of June 30, 2012
Type	Northern Route	Southern Routes	Western Routes	Eastern Route	Frequency
All days		3	1 / 3	1	Every FIVE minutes
Express Monday through Saturday; All day	B23	H54	K23 / K54		Every two minutes

=== Dual services ===
Services rendered since May 31, 2014
Kind	Routes to the North	Routes to the South
Dual Monday to Sunday all day	M86	K86

== See also ==
- Bogotá
- TransMilenio
- List of TransMilenio Stations
