= Universidad Nacional (TransMilenio) =

Bus stop in Bogotá, Colombia

Coordinates: 4.6369°N 74.0793°W

Universidad Nacional de Colombia
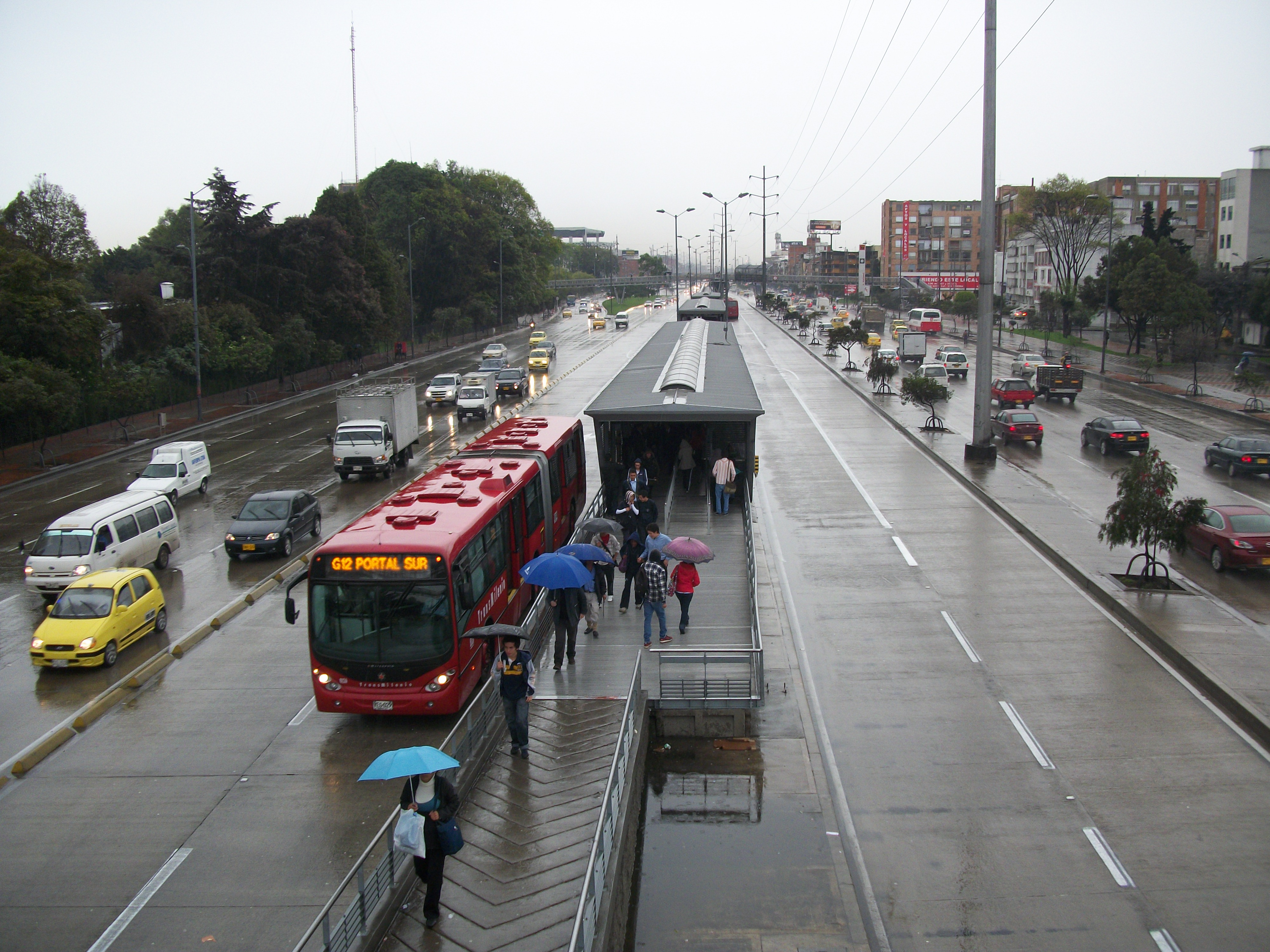

General information
- Location: Teusaquillo; Colombia

History
- Opened: 2005

Services
Preceding station	TransMilenio	Following station
Campín towards La Castellana	E	Avenida El Dorado towards Tygua - San José
Location

The simple-station Universidad Nacional de Colombia is part of the TransMilenio mass-transit system of Bogotá, Colombia.

== Location ==
The station is located north of downtown Bogotá, specifically on Avenida NQS with entrances on Calles 45A and 48.

== History ==
This station opened in 2005 as part of the second line of phase two of TransMilenio construction, opening service to Avenida NQS. It serves the demand of the Universidad Nacional de Colombia and surrounding neighborhoods.

== Station Services ==
=== Old trunk services ===
Services rendered until April 29, 2006
Kind	Routes	Frequency
Current		Every 3 minutes on average
Express	Expreso 130 Expreso 160	Every 2 minutes on average

=== Main Line Service ===
Services provided since July 23, 2012
Kind	Routes to the North	Routes to the South	Routes to the West
Easy route	4 7	4 7	
Express every day, all day	D22	G22	
Express; Monday to Saturday, all day	B12 E44	G12 G44	
Express; Monday to Friday, morning and afternoon peak hours	B28 C30	G30	F28
Express; Saturdays from 5:00 a.m. to 3:00 p.m.	C30	G30	

=== Feeder routes ===
This station does not have connections to feeder routes.

=== Inter-city service ===
This station does not have inter-city service.

== See also ==
- Bogotá
- TransMilenio
- List of TransMilenio Stations
