= Avenida Chile (TransMilenio) =

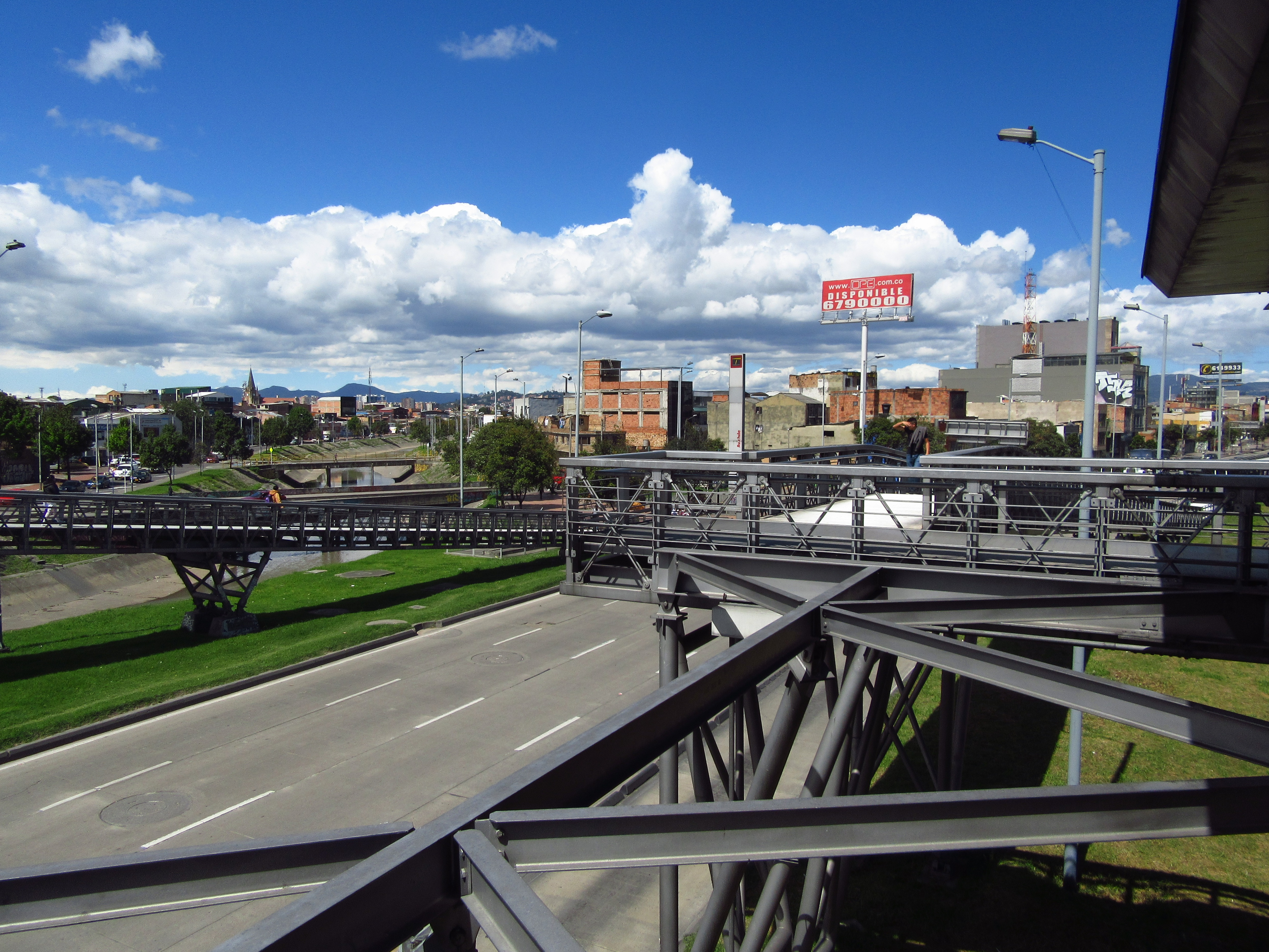

General information
- Location: Barrios Unidos; Colombia

History
- Opened: 2005

Services
Preceding station	TransMilenio	Following station
NQS Calle 75 towards La Castellana	E	Simón Bolívar towards Tygua - San José
Location

The simple-station Avenida Chile is part of the TransMilenio mass-transit system of Bogotá, Colombia, opened in the year 2000.

== Location ==
The station is located in northern Bogotá, specifically on Avenida NQS between Calles 69 and 71A.

== History ==
This station opened in 2005 as part of the second line of phase two of TransMilenio construction, opening service to Avenida NQS. It serves the visitors to the Cementerio de Chapinero (Chapinero Cemetery), and the surrounding areas.

In 2021, the construction of Bogotá's Metro Line 1 began with a ceremony at the intersection of Avenida Chile, where designated lanes were built for pedestrians and cyclists, as well as an underpass for cars.

== Station services ==
=== Old trunk services ===
Services rendered until April 29, 2006
Kind	Routes	Frequency
Current		Every 3 minutes on average
Express	Expreso 130	Every 2 minutes on average

=== Trunk services ===
Services provided since July 23, 2012
Kind	Routes to the North	Routes to the South	Routes to the West
Easy route	4 7	4 7	
Express every day all day	D22	G22	
Express Monday to Saturday all day	B72	H61	
Express Monday to Friday all day	B16		K16
Express Monday to Saturday morning rush hour	E32		
Express Monday to Saturday afternoon peak hour			F32
Express Monday to Saturday rush morning and afternoon	B28		F28
Express on Sundays and holidays	C96	G96	

=== Feeder routes ===
This station does not have connections to feeder routes.

=== Inter-city service ===
This station does not have inter-city service.

== See also ==
- Bogotá
- TransMilenio
- List of TransMilenio Stations
