= Movistar Arena =

Movistar Arena refers to:

- Movistar Arena (Bogotá), an indoor arena in Colombia
  - Movistar Arena (TransMilenio), a bus rapid transit station near the arena
- Movistar Arena (Buenos Aires), an indoor arena in Argentina
- Movistar Arena (Madrid), an indoor arena in Spain
- Movistar Arena (Santiago), an indoor arena in Chile
