= Centro Memoria (TransMilenio) =

Bus stop in Bogotá, Colombia

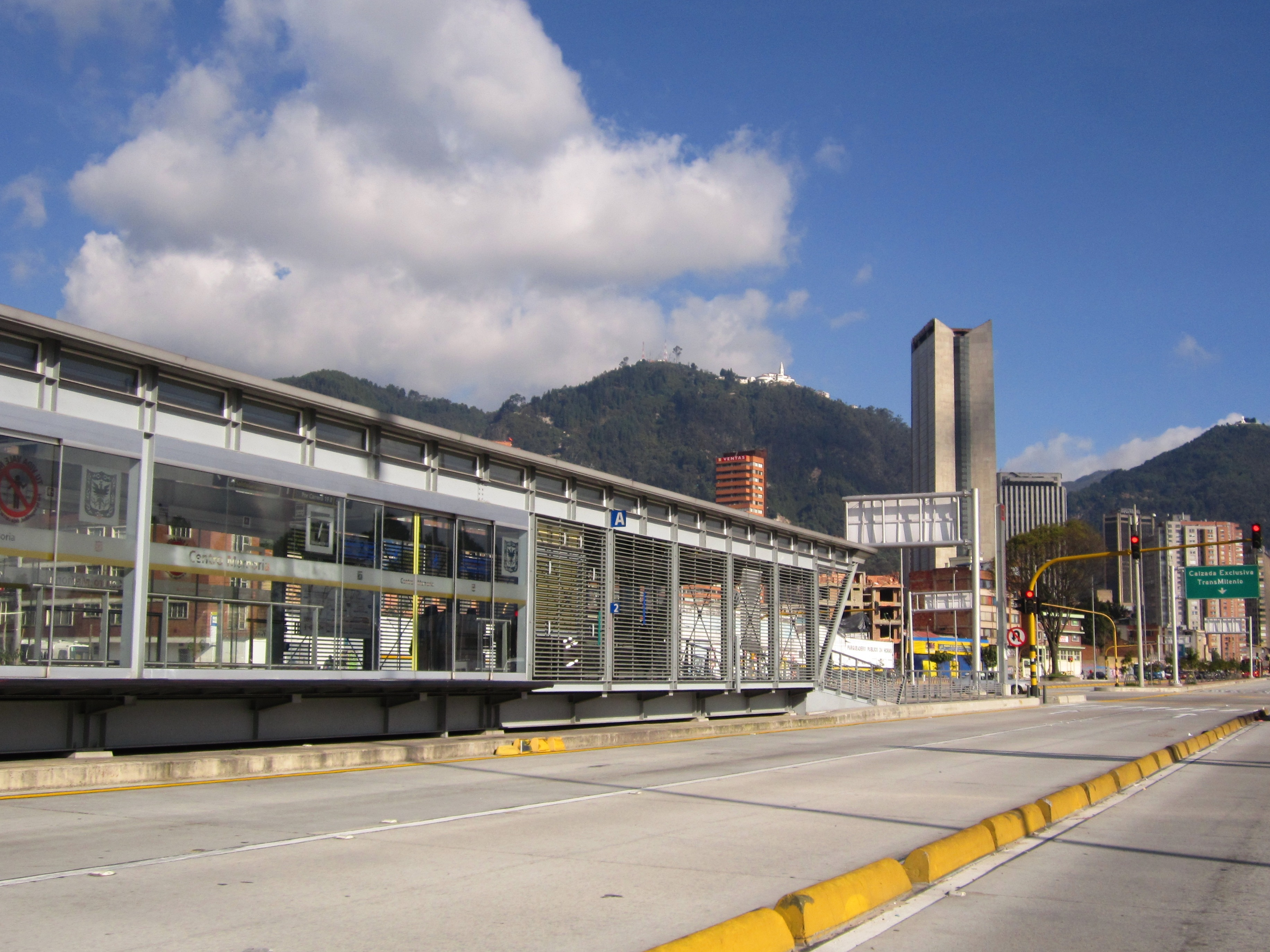

General information
- Location: Av.Calle 26 with Carrera 19B and Carrera 24/25; Los Mártires and Teusaquillo, Bogotá; Colombia

History
- Opened: August 6, 2012

Services
Preceding station	TransMilenio	Following station
Universidades Terminus	K	Concejo de Bogotá towards Portal Eldorado

Centro Memoria is a station that is part of the mass transit system of Bogotá, TransMilenio.

== Location ==
It is located in the center of the city, on the Avenida El Dorado between races 19B and 23. It is accessed by means of a traffic light crossing located on the Carrera 19B and by a bridge Pedestrian street located on Carrera 24 (north side); Carrera 25 (south side).

Serves the demand of the neighborhoods, Santa Fe, Florida, La Estrella and environs.

Nearby are the Central Cemetery, the Renaissance Park, the Roberto Arias Perez Theater and the supermarket Calle Colsubsidio.

== Etymology ==
The station receives its name from the Center of Memory, Peace and Reconciliation, built in a lot diagonal to the station. Initially it was called Renaissance Park.

== Story ==
This station is part of Phase III of TransMilenio that began to be constructed in the end of 2009 and, after several delays related to cases of corruption, was delivered the August 6 of 2012.

=== Current Trunk Services ===
Service as of June 30, 2012
Type	Western Routes	Eastern Route	Southern Routes	Frequency
All days	1 / 3	1	3	Every FIVE minutes
Express Monday through Saturday; All day	K10		L10	Every two minutes
Express Sundays and holidays	K97		L97	Every 3–4 minutes

=== Feeder routes ===
This station does not have connections to feeder routes.

=== Inter-city service ===
This station does not have inter-city service.

== See also ==
- List of TransMilenio Stations
