= NQS Calle 75 (TransMilenio) =

Part of the TransMilenio

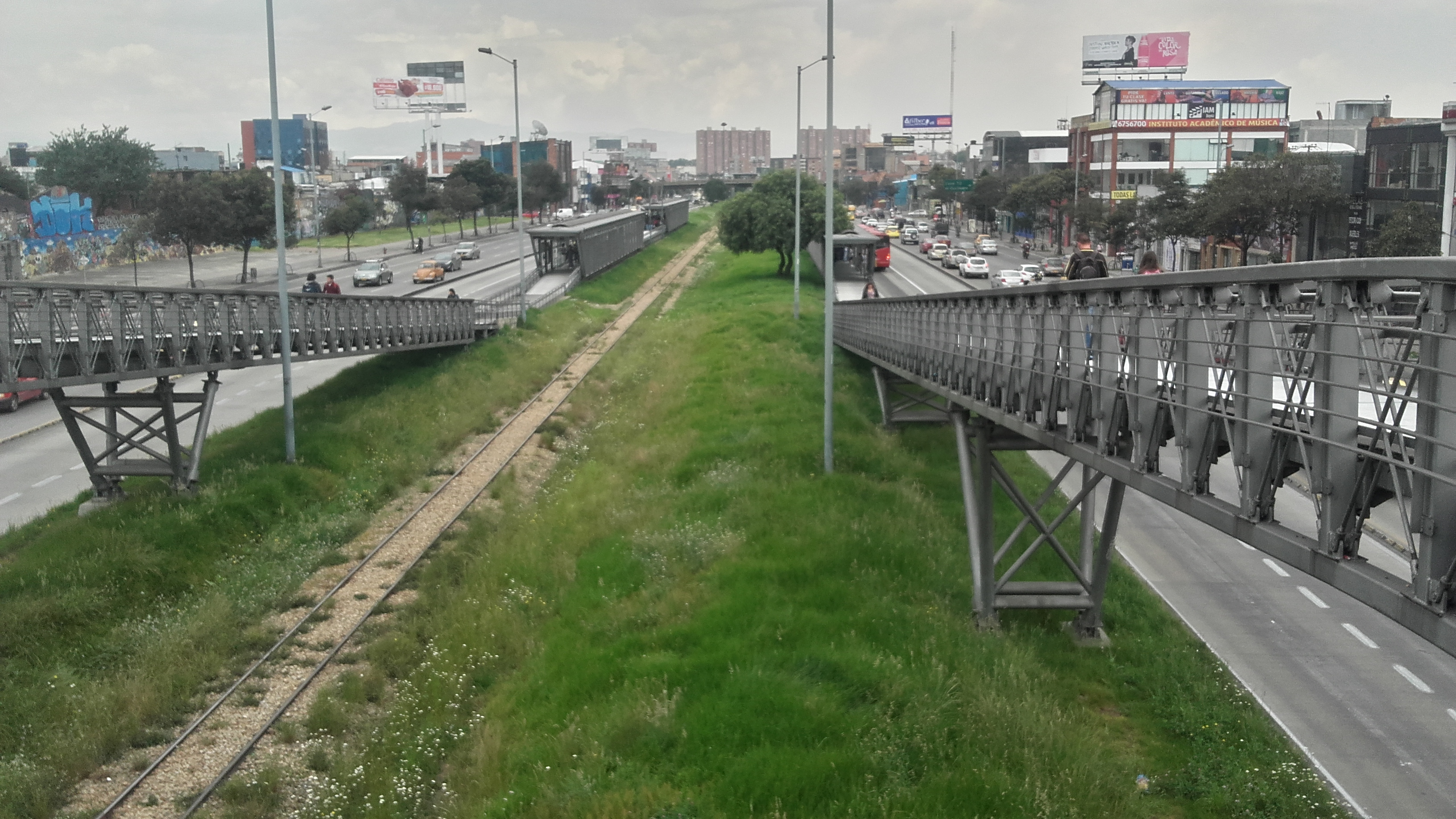

General information
- Location: Barrios Unidos; Colombia

History
- Opened: 2005

Services
Preceding station	TransMilenio	Following station
La Castellana Terminus	E	Avenida Chile towards Tygua - San José
Location

The simple-station NQS Calle 75 is part of the TransMilenio mass-transit system of Bogotá, Colombia, opened in the year 2000.

== Location ==
The station is located in northern Bogotá, specifically on Avenida NQS with Calle 75.

== History ==
This station opened in 2005 as part of the second line of phase two of TransMilenio construction, opening service to Avenida NQS. It serves the demand of the residential area around Calle 75.

The station is named NQS Calle 75 due to its proximity to those two main roads.

== Station services ==
=== Old trunk services ===
Services rendered until April 29, 2006
Kind	Routes	Frequency
Current		Every 3 minutes on average
Express	Expreso 150	Every 2 minutes on average

=== Main line service ===
Services rendered since April 29, 2006
Kind	Routes to the North	Routes to the East	Routes to the South	Routes to the West
Easy route	4 7		4 7	
Expressed every day all day	D22		G22	
Express Monday to Saturday all day	B12		G12	
Express Monday to Saturday morning and evening rush	B28			F28 F32
Express Monday to Friday morning and evening rush	C30		G30	
Express Saturdays from 5:00 a.m. At 3:00 p.m.	C30		G30	
Express on Sundays and holidays	B90		G90	
Routes that finish the route in this station
Express Monday to Friday morning rush hour	E32			

=== Feeder routes ===
This station does not have connections to feeder routes.

=== Inter-city service ===
This station does not have inter-city service.

== See also ==
- Bogotá
- TransMilenio
- List of TransMilenio Stations
