= Estadio La Raza =

Tennis court in Medellín, Colombia

- Interactive map of Estadio La Raza
- Location: Medellín, Colombia
- Coordinates: 6.258708°N 75.590111°W
- Capacity: 10,000

Construction
- Built: 1958

Website
- www.estadios.org/colombia/7734/estadio-la-raza/

Estadio La Raza is the main tennis court in Medellín, Colombia. Built in 1958, it currently holds 10,000 spectators.

== See also ==
- Football in Colombia
- List of football stadiums in Colombia
- List of South American stadiums by capacity
