= Guatoque - Veraguas (TransMilenio) =

Bus stop in Bogotá, Colombia

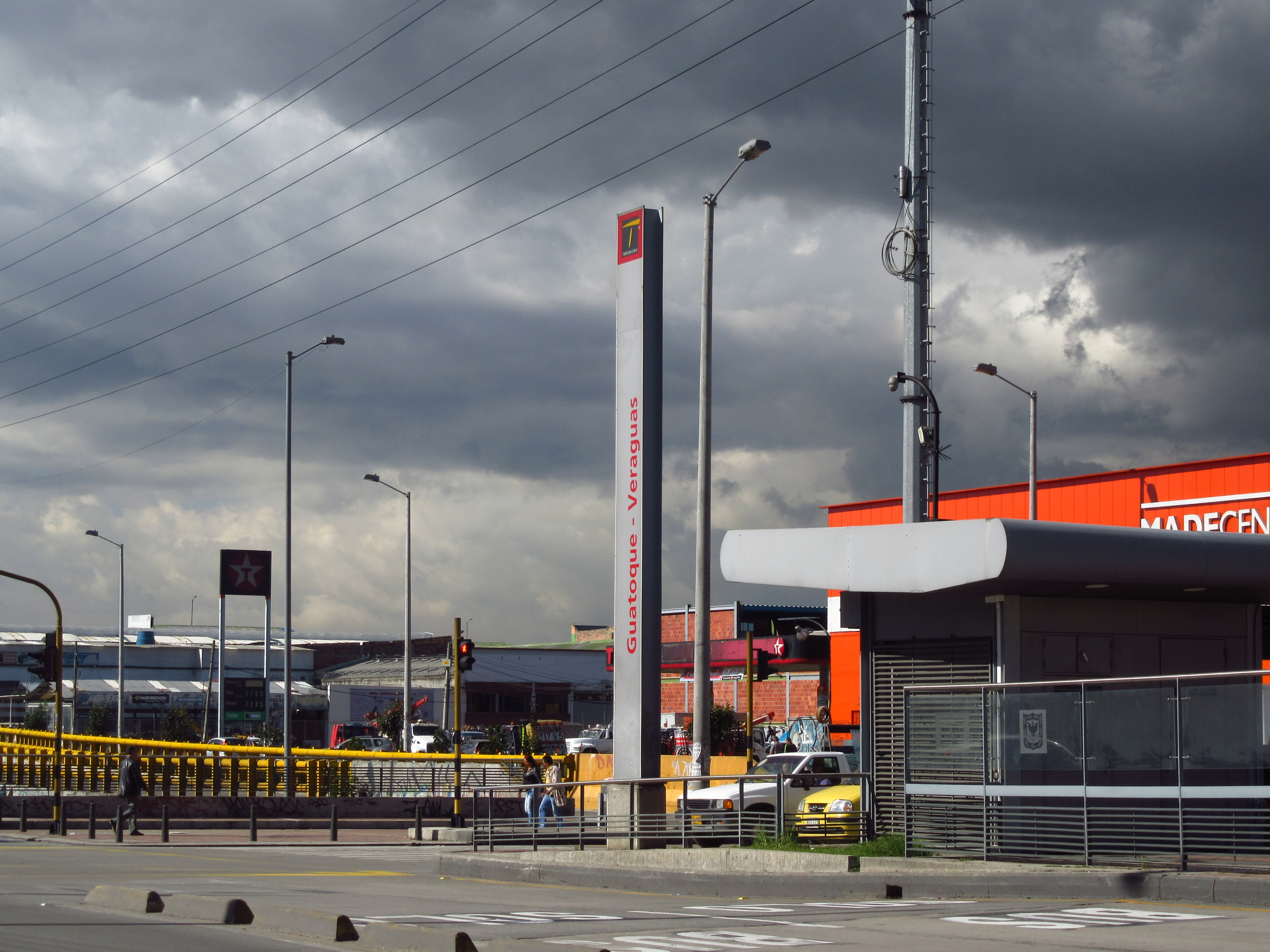

General information
- Location: Av.Calle 6 with Av.Carrera 27; Los Mártires
- Line: NQS Central
- Platforms: 4

History
- Opened: November 7, 2015

Services
Preceding station	TransMilenio	Following station
Ricaurte towards La Castellana	E	Tygua - San José Terminus
Location

The simple station without exchange Guatoque - Veraguas, forms part of the TransMilenio mass transit system of Bogotá inaugurated in the year 2000.

== Location ==
The station is located in the sector of the center-west of the city, more specifically on the Avenue of the Comuneros with the carrera 27.

Serves the demand of the neighborhoods Veraguas, El Progreso, Ricaurte and its surroundings. The area is residential and industrial.

== Origin of the name ==
The name Guatoque means "creek" or "ravine" in the language Muysccubun, taking into account that where the station is located, the Comuneros channel that collects the waters of the rivers San Agustín and San Francisco, the second name Veraguas receives it of the neighborhood located on the south side.

== History ==
In 2012, when the phase III of the system was put into operation, the construction of the Sixth Street or Avenida los Comuneros trunk was started to establish a connection between the trunks of Carrera Tenth, Caracas Avenue and NQS. It was inaugurated in November 2015 and together with the one of Tygua - San José conform that trunk that is an extension of the Central NQS.

=== Main Services ===
Services rendered from November 7, 2015
Type	Routes to the North	Routes to the South	Routes to the East
Express Monday to Saturday; All day	B72	G47H61	M47
Express Monday to Saturday; Morning rush	B71		
Express Sundays and holidays		G47	M47
Ending routes
Tipo	Routes to the North	Route to the West	
Local	8	8	
