= List of stadiums in Colombia =

The following is a list of stadiums in Colombia, ordered by capacity.

== Covered stadiums ==
#	Stadium	Capacity	City	Inaugurated	Ref
1	Coliseo MedPlus	24,000	Cota	2022	
2	Movistar Arena	14,000	Bogotá	1973	
3	Coliseo El Pueblo	12,000	Cali	1971	
4	Coliseo Mayor Rafael Cuartas Gaviria	10,400	Pereira	1966	
5	Coliseo del Café	9,000	Armenia	1986	
6	Coliseo Álvaro Sánchez Silva	8,000	Neiva	1986	
7	Coliseo Cubierto Julio Monsalvo	8,000	Valledupar	1999	
8	Coliseo Mayor de Ibagué	8,000	Ibagué	2023	
9	Coliseo Bicentenario	7,000	Bucaramanga	2011	
10	Coliseo Álvaro Mesa Amaya	7,000	Villavicencio	1973	
11	Coliseo Toto Hernández	7,000	Cúcuta	1953	
12	Coliseo Luis Fernando Castellanos	7,000	Barrancabermeja	1988	
13	Coliseo Tulio Ospina	6,500	Bello	1978	
14	Coliseo Iván de Bedout	6,000	Medellín	1955	
15	Coliseo León XIII	6,000	Soacha		
16	Coliseo Cubierto de Itagüí	5,000	Itagüi	2010	
17	Coliseo El Salitre	5,000	Bogotá	1973	
18	Coliseo del Sur	5,000	Calarcá		
19	Coliseo Vicente Díaz Romero	5,000	Bucaramanga	1966	
20	Coliseo Jorge Arango Uribe	5,000	Manizales	1936	
21	Coliseo Multifuncional del Líbano	5,000	Líbano		
22	Coliseo Roberto Lozano Batalla	5,000	Buenaventura		
23	Coliseo Municipal de Pitalito	4,500	Pitalito		
24	Coliseo Sergio Antonio Ruano	4,500	Pasto		
25	Coliseo Bernardo Caraballo	4,500	Cartagena		
26	Coliseo Evangelista Mora	4,500	Cali		
27	Coliseo Rubén Darío Quintero	4,500	Rionegro		
28	Polideportivo Las Delicias	4,000	Sincelejo		
29	Coliseo Cayetano Cañizares	4,000	Bogotá		
30	Coliseo Edmundo Luna Santos	4,000	Bucaramanga		
31	Coliseo de La Luna	4,000	Chía		
32	Coliseo Miguel Happy Lora	3,900	Montería		
33	Nuevo Coliseo Municipal	3,700	Mosquera		
34	Coliseo Cubierto Diego de Carvajal	3,115	Magangué		
35	Coliseo Elías Chegwin	3,000	Barranquilla		
36	Palacio de los Deportes	3,000	Bogotá		
37	Coliseo Ginny Bay	3,000	San Andrés		
38	Coliseo Northon Madrid	2,746	Cartagena		
39	Coliseo Arena de Sal	2,600	Zipaquirá		
40	Coliseo Yesid Santos	2,500	Medellín		
41	Coliseo Municipal de Tunja	2,500	Tunja		
42	Coliseo Cubierto San Antonio	2,400	Tunja		
43	Coliseo Universidad de Medellín	2,100	Medellín		
44	Coliseo Cubierto Juan Viessi	2,000	Florencia		
45	Coliseo Cubierto Argelino Durán Quintero	2,000	Ocaña		
46	Coliseo La Estancia	2,000	Popayán		
47	Coliseo Simón Bolívar de Saravena	1,700	Saravena		
48	Coliseo Edgardo Vives	1,600	Santa Marta		
49	Coliseo General Santander	1,000	Soacha		
50	Coliseo Usco	-	Neiva		
51	Coliseo Ventura Castillo	-	La Dorada		
52	Coliseo Municipal de Lebrija	-	Lebrija		
53	Coliseo Enrique Triana Castillo	-	Ibagué		
54	Coliseo Fortaleza de Piedra	-	Cajicá		
55	Coliseo Cubierto Alfonso Patiño Roselli	-	Sogamoso		
56	Coliseo Santiago Apóstol	-	Tenjo		
57	Coliseo Mayor de Duitama	-	Duitama		
58	Coliseo Municipal de Funza	-	Funza		
59	Coliseo Municipal de Paipa	-	Paipa		
60	Coliseo Cubierto Xiua	-	Sibaté		
61	Coliseo Mayor de Las Vegas	-	Melgar		
62	Coliseo Polideportivo de Tocancipá	-	Tocancipá		
63	Coliseo de Faca	-	Facatativá		
64	Coliseo Municipal de Tabio	-	Tabio		
65	Polideportivo Municipal de Castilla La Nueva	-	Castilla La Nueva		

== See also ==
- List of South American stadiums by capacity
- Lists of stadiums
