= List of football stadiums in Colombia =

The following is a list of football stadiums in Colombia, ordered by capacity. The listed stadiums are or were used in at least a season by a professional team. The largest stadiums in Colombia which are not used for football are the 14,500-capacity Santamaría Bullring in Bogotá and the Estadio Édgar Rentería, a 12,000-capacity baseball stadium in Barranquilla.

== Current stadiums ==
| # | Image | Stadium | Capacity | City | Home team | Opened | Ref |
|---|---|---|---|---|---|---|---|
| 1 | | Estadio Metropolitano Roberto Meléndez | 65,000 | Barranquilla | Colombia national football team, Junior | 1986 | |
| 2 | | Estadio Atanasio Girardot | 44,863 | Medellín | Atlético Nacional, Independiente Medellín | 1953 | |
| 3 | | Estadio Deportivo Cali | 42,000 | Palmira | Deportivo Cali | 2010 | |
| 4 | | Estadio El Campín | 39,512 | Bogotá | Millonarios, Santa Fe | 1938 | |
| 5 | | Estadio Olímpico Pascual Guerrero | 38,588 | Cali | América de Cali, Atlético, Boca Juniors | 1937 | |
| 6 | | Estadio General Santander | 32,163 | Cúcuta | Cúcuta Deportivo | 1940 | |
| 7 | | Estadio Palogrande | 31,611 | Manizales | Once Caldas | 1994 | |
| 8 | | Estadio Hernán Ramírez Villegas | 30,297 | Pereira | Deportivo Pereira | 1971 | |
| 9 | | Estadio Manuel Murillo Toro | 28,100 | Ibagué | Deportes Tolima | 1955 | |
| 10 | | Estadio Américo Montanini | 28,000 | Bucaramanga | Atlético Bucaramanga | 1948 | |
| 11 | | Estadio Guillermo Plazas Alcid | 27,000 | Neiva | | 1980 | |
| 12 | | Estadio Centenario | 23,500 | Armenia | Deportes Quindío | 1988 | |
| 13 | | Estadio Eduardo Santos | 23,000 | Santa Marta | | 1951 | |
| 14 | | Estadio La Independencia | 20,630 | Tunja | Boyacá Chicó, Patriotas | 2000 | |
| 15 | | Estadio Departamental Libertad | 20,000 | Pasto | Deportivo Pasto | 1954 | |
| 16 | | Estadio Jaime Morón León | 17,280 | Cartagena | Real Cartagena | 1960 | |
| 17 | | Estadio Doce de Octubre | 16,000 | Tuluá | | 1967 | |
| 17 | | Estadio Sierra Nevada | 16,000 | Santa Marta | Unión Magdalena | 2017 | |
| 19 | | Estadio Luis Antonio Duque Peña | 15,000 | Girardot | | 1963 | |
| 19 | | Estadio Francisco Rivera Escobar | 15,000 | Palmira | Inter Palmira | 1954 | |
| 19 | | Estadio Bello Horizonte | 15,000 | Villavicencio | Llaneros | 1972 | |
| 22 | | Estadio Polideportivo Sur | 14,000 | Envigado | Envigado | 1992 | |
| 22 | | Estadio Alberto Grisales | 14,000 | Rionegro | Águilas Doradas | 1978 | |
| 24 | | Estadio Metropolitano Ciudad de Itagüí | 12,000 | Itagüí | Itagüí Leones | 1994 | |
| 24 | | Estadio Alfonso López Pumarejo | 12,000 | Bogotá | | 1938 | |
| 24 | | Estadio Jaraguay | 12,000 | Montería | Jaguares | 2012 | |
| 27 | | Estadio Tulio Ospina | 12,000 | Bello | | 1978 | |
| 28 | | Estadio Romelio Martínez | 11,000 | Barranquilla | Barranquilla | 1934 | |
| 29 | | Estadio Daniel Villa Zapata | 10,400 | Barrancabermeja | Orsomarso | | |
| 30 | | Estadio John Jairo Tréllez | 10,000 | Turbo | | | |
| 30 | | Estadio Armando Maestre Pavajeau | 10,000 | Valledupar | Alianza | | |
| 30 | | Estadio Alberto Mora Mora | 10,000 | Pereira | | | |
| 30 | | Estadio Metropolitano de Techo | 10,000 | Bogotá | Bogotá, Fortaleza, Internacional de Bogotá, Tigres | 1954 | |
| 34 | | Estadio Álvaro Gómez Hurtado | 9,000 | Floridablanca | | 2013 | |
| 34 | | Estadio Santiago de las Atalayas | 9,000 | Yopal | | 2006 | |
| 34 | | Estadio Diego de Carvajal | 9,000 | Magangué | | 1948 | |
| 37 | | Estadio Luis Carlos Galán Sarmiento | 8,000 | Soacha | | 1990 | |
| 37 | | Estadio Hernando Azcárate Martínez | 8,000 | Buga | | | |
| 37 | | Estadio Marcos Henríquez | 8,000 | Sabanalarga | | | |
| 40 | | Estadio Julia Turbay Samur | 7,000 | El Carmen de Bolívar | | 2013 | |
| 41 | | Estadio Federico Serrano Soto | 6,000 | Riohacha | | 2013 | |
| 42 | | Estadio Villa Concha | 5,500 | Piedecuesta | Real Santander | | |
| 43 | | Estadio Alberto Buitrago Hoyos | 5,000 | Florencia | | 1963 | |
| 44 | | Estadio Hermides Padilla | 5,000 | Ocaña | | | |
| 45 | | Estadio Ciro López | 5,000 | Popayán | | | |
| 45 | | Estadio Carlos Alberto Bernal | 5,000 | La Ceja | | | |
| 45 | | Estadio Arturo Cumplido Sierra | 5,000 | Sincelejo | | | |
| 48 | | Estadio Compensar | 4,500 | Bogotá | | 1998 | |
| 48 | | Estadio Fernando Mazuera | 4,500 | Fusagasugá | | | |
| 50 | | Estadio Orlando Aníbal Monroy | 4,000 | Caucasia | | 1993 | |
| 50 | | Estadio Municipal de Cota | 4,000 | Cota | | | |
| 50 | | Estadio Cincuentenario | 4,000 | Medellín | | 1979 | |
| 53 | | Estadio Cacique Jamundí | 3,560 | Jamundí | | | |
| 54 | | Estadio Municipal Raúl Miranda | 3,500 | Yumbo | Independiente Yumbo | | |
| 55 | | Polideportivo El Cristal | 3,240 | Buenaventura | | | |
| 56 | | Estadio Erwin O'Neil | 3,000 | San Andrés Island | | 2008 | |
| 56 | | Estadio Municipal de Ciénaga | 3,000 | Ciénaga | | 2014 | |
| 58 | | Parque Estadio Olaya Herrera | 2,500 | Bogotá | Real Cundinamarca | | |
| 59 | | Estadio Municipal Jorge Torres Rocha | 2,200 | Facatativá | | | |
| 60 | | Estadio Municipal Los Zipas | 2,000 | Zipaquirá | | | |
| 60 | | Estadio San José de Armenia | 2,000 | Armenia | Deportes Quindío (reserve team) | 1951 | |

== See also ==
- List of stadiums in Colombia
- List of South American stadiums by capacity
- Lists of stadiums
- Football in Colombia
