= Estadio Olímpico Pascual Guerrero =

Football stadium

Coordinates: 3°25′47.6″N 76°32′27.9″W

Estadio Olimpico Pascual Guerrero
- Pascual Guerrero
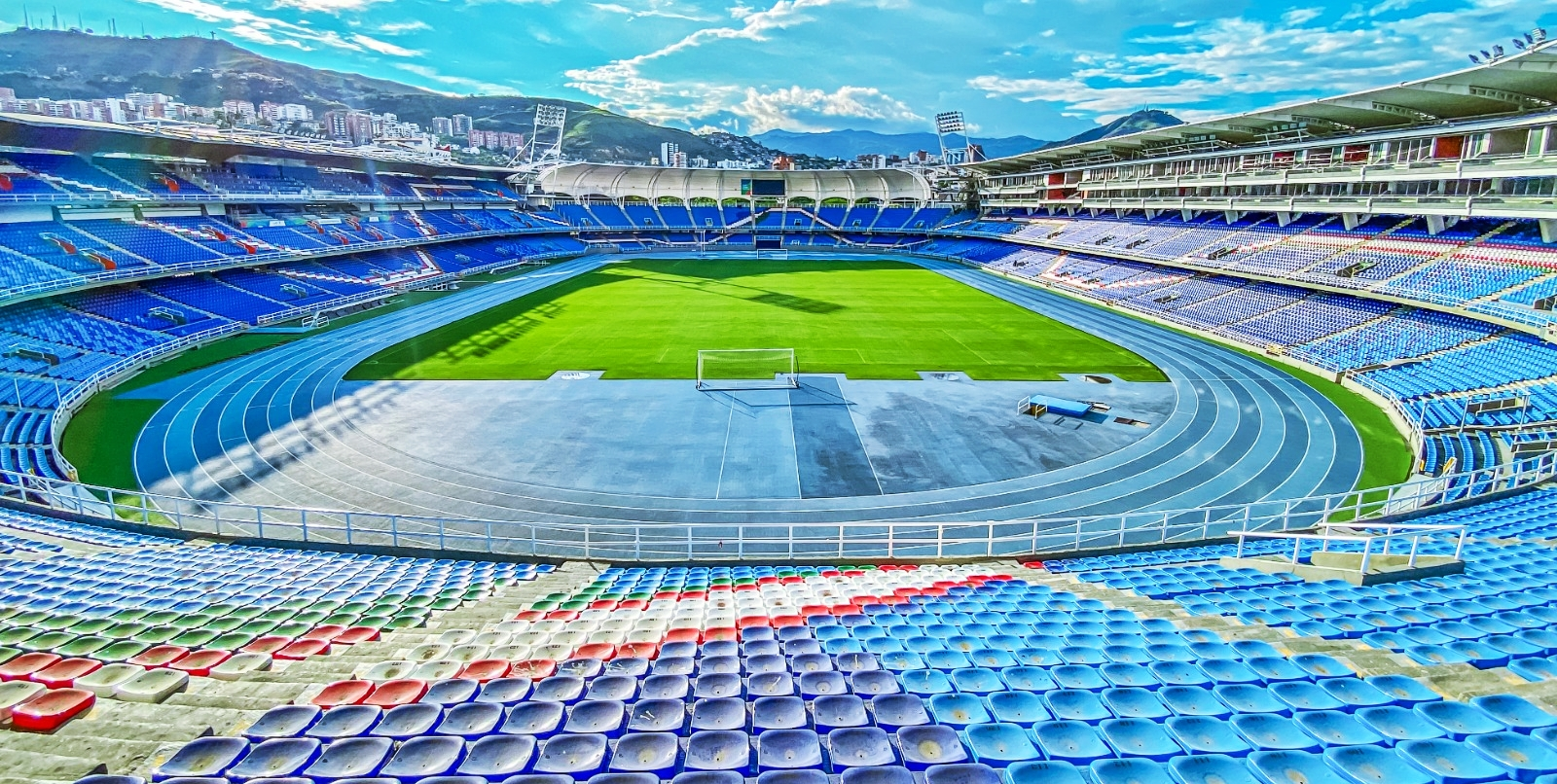
- Interactive map of Estadio Olimpico Pascual Guerrero
- Location: Cali, Colombia
- Capacity: 37,000
- Surface: Grass

Construction
- Opened: July 20, 1937
- Renovated: 2010–11

Tenants
- América de Cali; Atlético F.C. Boca Juniors de Cali

The Estadio Olimpico Pascual Guerrero is a football stadium, also used for athletics, concerts, and rugby sevens, in Cali, Colombia. The stadium is named to honor the poet Pascual Guerrero. The stadium and the sports complex that surrounds it are one of the finest and most modern sports complexes in Latin America, and led to references of Cali as the "Sports Capital of America".

The "Pascual", as Cali's inhabitants usually call the stadium, replaced the now defunct Estadio Galilea which was located in the Versailles neighbourhood, where the first national athletics competition was held in 1928. The Pascual is still an important venue for domestic and international sporting events.

With renovations made for the 2011 FIFA U-20 World Cup in Colombia and additional suits and sky boxes, the stadium's capacity was reduced to 35,405 people. It is currently the home of América de Cali, Atlético, and Boca Juniors de Cali and was the home of Deportivo Cali until 2015 when they moved permanently into their new stadium.

== History ==
In 1935, the poet Pascual Guerrero asked the Valle del Cauca Department government to build a stadium on the grounds he offered. On 20 July 1937, construction was completed, and the facility opened with the name "Estadio Departamental". President Alfonso López Pumarejo was present when the stadium was inaugurated with a quadrangular tournament among the countries of Argentina, Cuba, Mexico and Colombia. The opening of the stadium coincided with celebrations to mark the fourth centenary of the founding of Cali. Subsequently, on November 4, 1957, the government of the Valle del Cauca ceded to the Universidad del Valle the lands that comprise the entire sports complex, a gift ratified by the Ministry of Government.

In 1948 the first game of professional football was played at the stadium, and in 1954 the stadium hosted the seventh edition of the National Games of Colombia. It was remodeled and expanded, with Olympic swimming pools built, and consequently renamed "San Fernando Sports Complex".

With the appointment of Cali as host of the 1971 Pan American Games, in 1967 the stadium was restructured and adapted to Olympic standards of the time, and a 8-lane track developed in synthetic tartan, pit and spaces for shot put and hammer, long jump and pole vault were built. The capacity was expanded to accommodate 45,000 spectators, and floodlights and an electronic bulletin board were added. With the reform, the Sports Unit of San Fernando that was built for the 1954 National Games, became part of the Pan American Sports Unit that hosted the sixth Pan American Games.

On the occasion of the 1995 Pacific Ocean Games some physical renovations were approved, including its Synthetic Tartan track, which was replaced in its entirety according to the requirements for competitions to be held in 1995.

Due to the deterioration of the north grandstand of the stadium it was closed for several years until its remodeling began in 1999. In 2000 further renovations were approved at its facilities, making special emphasis on the correction of structural and locational problems as well as a complete replacement of the grass playing surface and drainage, ahead of the 2001 Copa América.

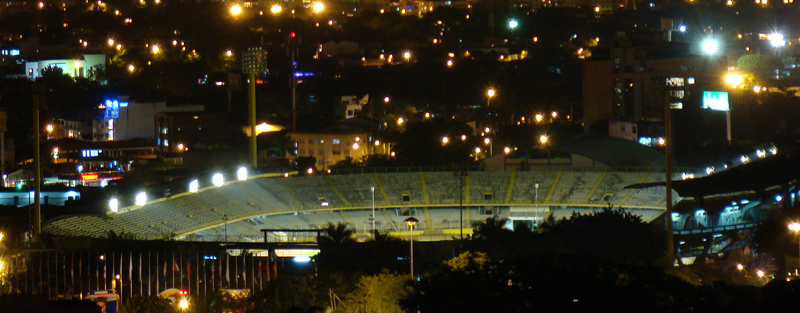
Cali's Pascual Guerrero Stadium before 2011's renovation

In 2005, due to the 43rd edition of the South American Championships in Athletics, the synthetic track was repaired in several sections, this time using a material approved by the International Association of Athletics Federations (IAAF) named Sport Flex. The stadium's tracks, fields, and the nearby sports complex underwent further renovations since October 2006 ahead of the 2008 National Games, with a large-scale renovation work that saw the construction of boxes and VIP areas in the western grandstand and underground parking in the southern stand, the replacement of the former electronic board for a new screen, the installation of seats throughout the stadium, as well as a new roof covering all grandstands of the stadium and consisting of a series of Calatrava trusses supporting a membrane or fabric structure being performed in preparation of the 2011 FIFA U-20 World Cup. The works began in the southern grandstand and lasted 16 months. Due to the new seating, stadium capacity was decreased to 35,405-seated stadium spectators.

The stadium was damaged in the 2026 Colombia earthquake on 10 August.

== Events ==
=== Sports ===
The stadium regularly hosts home matches of football clubs América de Cali, Atlético, and Boca Juniors de Cali, which compete in Categoría Primera A (América) and Categoría Primera B (Atlético and Boca Juniors), the two tiers of Colombian club football. It was also one of the host stadiums for the 2001 Copa América, being the headquarters of Group B. A total of six games between the national teams of Brazil, Paraguay, Peru and Mexico were played at the stadium between 11 and 17 July 2001. The stadium also hosted games in the 2011 FIFA U-20 World Cup and the 2022 Copa América Femenina. In 2024, it hosted matches of the 2024 FIFA U-20 Women's World Cup.

The stadium has also hosted the 1971 Pan American Games and the National Games on several occasions, the 1995 Games of the Pacific Ocean, the 2005 South American Championships in Athletics, the 2013 World Games, the 2015 World Athletics U18 Championship, the 2021 Junior Pan American Games and the 2022 World Athletics U20 Championships.

The stadium is also the training site and home for Liga Vallecaucana School and Intercollegiate Games.

=== Cultural Music ===
The more traditional music event that takes place in the stadium is the Super Concert, in which different bands and invited singers perform at the annual celebration named Feria de Cali, which is held between the 25th to the 30th of December. During the eighties, there was a big concert named "Festival de Orquestas" of La Feria de Cali, which for a whole day had different orchestras playing for about 12 hours.

Also, the stadium is the main stage of national and international artists. Juanes, Maná, Shakira, Soda Estereo, Marc Anthony, Gloria Estefan, David Gilmour and Roger Daltrey are some of the artists that have performed at the stadium. Vicente Fernandez is scheduled to perform at the stadium during his Mi Despedida World Tour.

Various Christian events have also been held at the venue, including a two-day 'Miracle Crusade' with Nigerian Pastor T.B. Joshua in 2014.

== Facilities ==
The stadium is divided into seven stands for sporting events (in order from lowest to highest ct):

- South Grandstand: For the same price as the northern platform, is the most economical. In the gallery are usually locate bars Baron Rojo Sur Team America and Frente Radical Verde Deportivo Cali team. These fans are known for being the "hooligans" from their respective teams and their violent history can not be on the same platform as the city teams play each other. Usually the fans of the team official visitor gallery is located in the north. The location and subsequent departure of the fans is controlled by the National Police.
- North Grandstand: In this forum, which is geographically located to the west, lies the electronic board, which after many years of being out of service, is making its reconstruction.
- Lower East Grandstand: On the first two floors of the east side of the stadium is the most popular platform from which there is a complete panorama of the stadium.
- Upper East Grandstand: The second of the two floors of the east side, offers a prime view of the stadium by not having to be interrupted by the safety net on the first floor.
- Tribuna 1st Floor West: On this side of the stadium the locker rooms are located, the area of arbitrators and the benches of both teams.
- Tribuna 3rd Floor West: In this area are booths and sports media transmission.
- West 2nd Floor Grandstand: It is the only forum in the stadium with numbered seats and therefore is reserved for members of the teams.

== Location and Access Routes ==
The stadium is located in the San Fernando traditional neighborhood in central-south of the city, between the traditional Fifth Street (Calle 5a) and Roosevelt Avenue (Calle 6a). Next to the stage of the Evangelista Mora gym arena, the Alberto Galindo Olympic Pools and form the so-called San Fernando Sports Unit also known as Pan American Sports Unit.

Access from the South or North of the city is Fifth Street, which passes a backbone of Mass Transit System MIO and has a station right in front of Parque de las Banderas. From the south you can get to the stadium along the Avenue of the Hippodrome (Better known as Ninth Street), going through the intersection of the Diagonal 34 to Roosevelt Avenue, which restricts access of vehicles during the course of the event.

Near the south stand is the "Booth Maria" ballots authorized outlets. The stadium has no parking, but often used is the street and surrounding streets to park cars, with no particular formal surveillance.

== Average attendances ==
Tenants	League season	Home games	Average attendance
América de Cali	2023 Clausura	10	21,852
América de Cali	2023 Apertura	10	20,769

== See also ==
- List of football stadiums in Colombia
- Lists of stadiums
