= Movistar Arena (Bogotá) =

Indoor sporting arena in Bogotá, Colombia

El Corazón de Bogotá
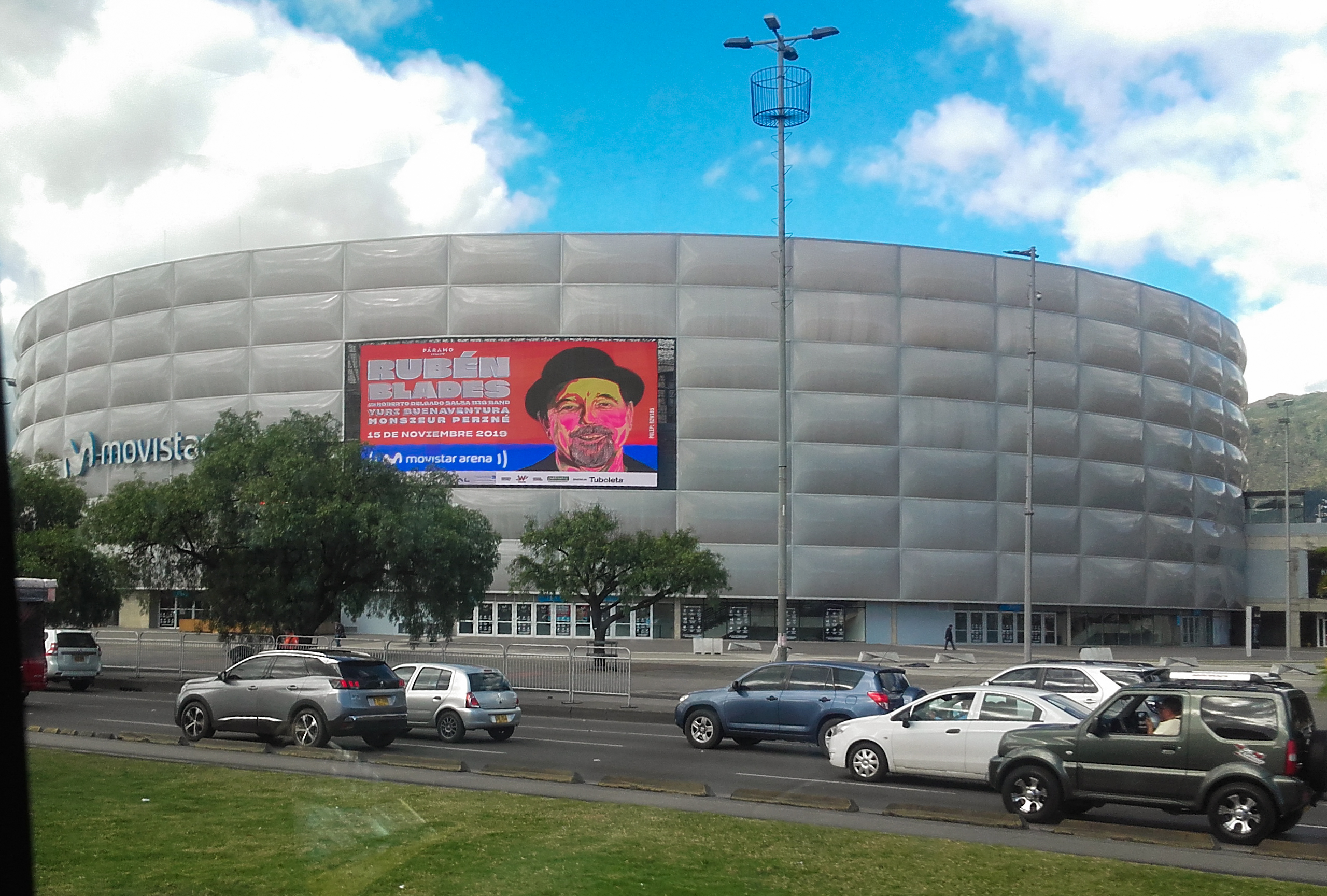
- El Corazón de Bogotá Arena in September 2018.
- Interactive map of El Corazón de Bogotá
- Full name: El Corazón de Bogotá – Arena
- Former names: Coliseo Cubierto El Campín (1971–2018) Movistar Arena (2018–2026)
- Location: Carrera 30 con calle 63; Cundinamarca; Bogotá, Colombia
- Coordinates: 4°38′57″N 74°4′38″W
- Owner: Alcaldía de Bogotá
- Operator: BeatHub Entertainment
- Capacity: 14,000
- Executive suites: 20
- Surface: 37.000 m2
- Public transit: Movistar Arena Station

Construction
- Groundbreaking: 26 May 1971
- Opened: 1 May 1973
- Renovated: 2017-2018
- Structural engineer: Eng. Guillermo Gonzalez Zuleta
- General contractors: Jorge Alvarado, Germán Guerrero and Oscar Lobo Reveiz

Website
- www.movistararena.co

El Corazón de Bogotá - Arena, previously known as Coliseo Cubierto El Campín and Movistar Arena, is an indoor sporting arena located in Bogotá, Colombia. It was built in 1973 and renovated in 2018. The arena capacity is up to 14,000 people and it hosts around 90 shows per year. Telefónica's cell phone division Movistar bought the arena's naming rights, changing its name in March 2018. It received its current name in October 2026 after Telefonica decided to divest its operations in Colombia.

== Tennis matches ==
Notable tennis players that have played at the arena include:

- Andre Agassi vs. Pete Sampras
- Anna Kournikova
- Karolína Plíšková
- Ashley Harkleroad
- Rafael Nadal vs. Novak Djokovic (Game played on 20 March 2011. It was a sold-out event, more than 13,000 people attended the event.)
- Roger Federer vs. Jo-Wilfried Tsonga

== History ==
=== As El Campín Coliseum ===
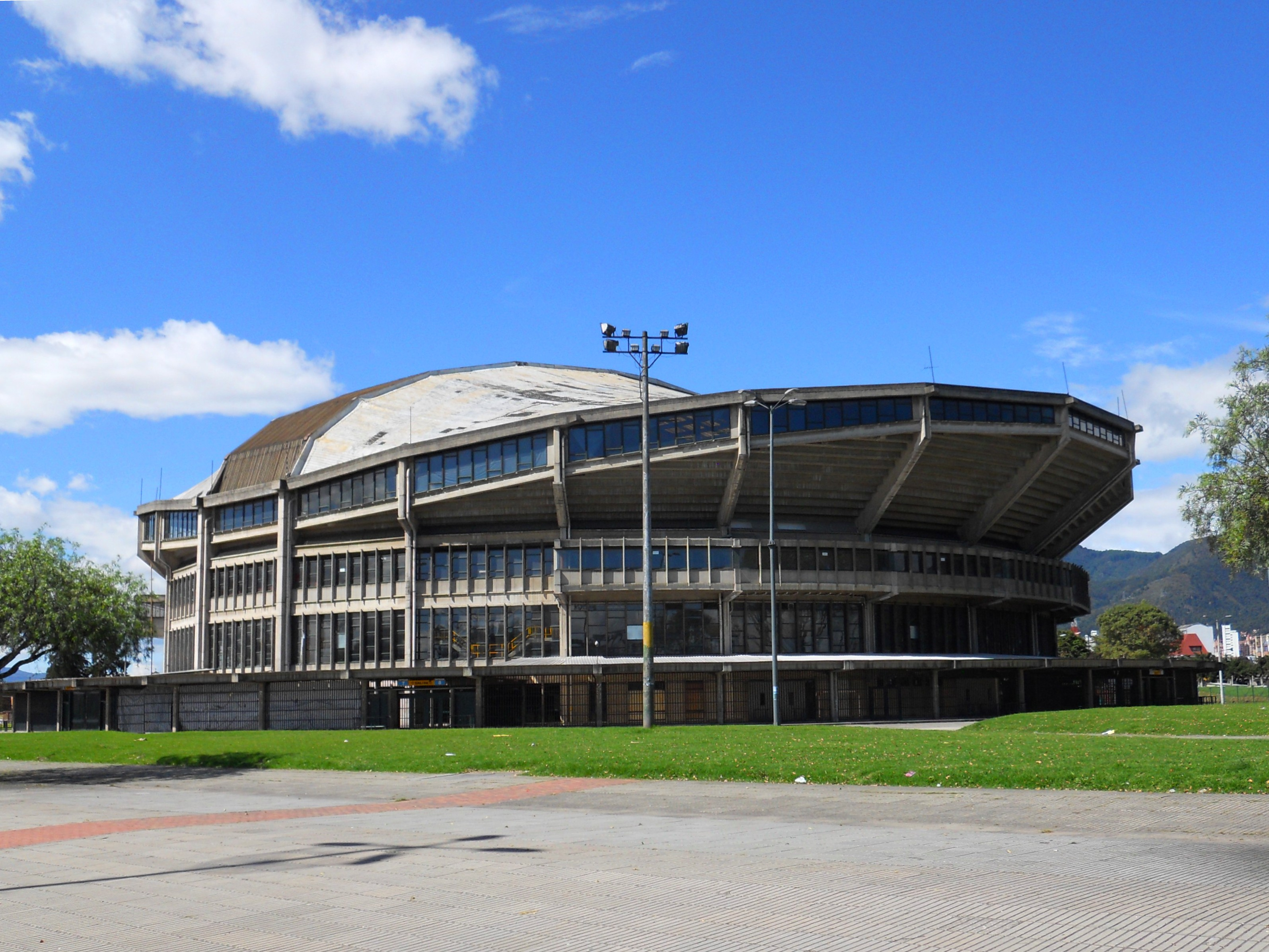
El Campín Coliseum in 2011

The estate on top of which the arena and neighboring buildings (such as El Campín Stadium) are built was donated to the city by Leonilde Matiz de Camacho and Luis Camacho Matiz, wife and son of Nemesio Camacho respectively, on 9 December 1937.

In 2011, following 16 years of lease to the private sector, the coliseum came back to the hands of the city government. On 19 January 2011, the District Institute of Recreation and Sports (IDRD by its Spanish-language initials) was informed in Bogotá City Council that the stage required reinforcement and technical improvements that required the IDRD to reduce the coliseum's capacity, thus recommending the city government the demolition of the stage, all for the construction of new installations for the city.

Faced with the possibility of demolition, some citizens opposed it, manifesting that the building had an important architectonic and historic value for the city. Due to these circumstances, the city government contracted a series of technical and feasibility studies that would help take a decision.

=== Renovation ===
On 14 January 2015 the IDRD and the Mayor of Bogota announced the "coliseum" would be renewed completely over the following two years. It would be a multi-event arena named Arena Sponsor Bogota which will have all the amenities needed be able to accommodate more elaborate events..

The upgrade expanded the arena's yearly capacity to more than one million spectators every year, as the new facilities allowed for quicker turnaround times, enabling it to host more than 90 events annually.

The renovation works themselves started in 2018. While the administration of the stadium was still in the hands of the IDRD, its operation was put in the hands of the Colombian branch of Spain's Telefónica (behind its brand Movistar) though a 20 year-long public-private alliance starting in 2018.

=== As Movistar Arena ===
External image
- The Israeli flag projected in the façade of the Movistar Arena

On 11 October 2023, four days after the October 7 attacks and in the first days of the Gaza genocide in Palestine, the arena projected the flag of Israel over its façade. Following outrage in social media over the belief the city government was behind the projection, the arena's Twitter account said that the projection of the Israeli flag was something done as "an act of human solidarity" by the communication team of the arena's administration without involvement of the city government whatsoever, as the arena is now administered by private company Colombiana de Escenarios. On 17 September 2026, Colombian company BeatHub Entertainment acquired the remaining 50% of the arena's operations from Chilean company BeLive Entertainment for an undisclosed amount, the IDRD still remains as owner of the arena.

=== As El Corazón de Bogotá ===
In 2026, due to the divesture of operations of Telefónica in Colombia and the subsequent merger of Movistar and Tigo, Telefónica and BeatHub decided to mutually terminate the naming rights agreement. On 31 October 2026, the arena unveiled its new name as El Corazón de Bogotá, the name change is expected to be temporary, until a new naming rights contract is made.

== Other events ==
In the arena there had been also many shows such as High School Musical The Ice Tour, and Disney on Ice. The WWE hosted their first house show in Bogota on 23 August 2019.

== Concerts ==
Artist	Date	Assistance
James Brown	August 1973	N/A
Santana	9 October 1973	N/A
Information Society & Estados Alterados	24 May 1991	N/A
Soda Stereo	23 September 1991	N/A
INXS & La Derecha	24 March 1994	N/A
Luis Miguel	10 June 1994	N/A
Delirious?	15 & 16 September 2006	N/A
Delirious?	1 February 2008	N/A
Dream Theater & Hiddenpath	12 March, 2008	N/A
Bryan Adams	9 April 2008	N/A
R.E.M., The Mars Volta & The Mills	29 October 2008	N/A
Duran Duran	12 November 2008	N/A
Maroon 5	20 November 2008	N/A
Fito Páez	13 December 2008	N/A
Juanes	14 December 2008	N/A
Los Fabulosos Cadillacs	28 February 2009	N/A
Keane & Sexto Sentido	3 March, 2009	N/A
Carlos Santana	12 March 2009	N/A
Motörhead & Ursus	21 April 2009	N/A
Heaven & Hell	5 May 2009	N/A
Sarah Brightman	28 October, 2009	N/A
Korn & Nepentes	10 April, 2010	N/A
Rubén Blades	1 May 2010	N/A
Miguel Bosé	8 May 2010	N/A
Gustavo Cerati	13 May 2010	N/A
Joaquín Sabina	22 May 2010	N/A
Demi Lovato	25 May, 2010	N/A
Massive Attack & Martina Topley-Bird	12 November 2010	N/A
The Smashing Pumpkins & Black Memory	27 November 2010	N/A
Stone Temple Pilots & El Sie7e	18 December 2010	N/A
Camila	11 May 2011	N/A
Miley Cyrus	19 May, 2011	N/A
Judas Priest, Whitesnake & Albatroz	23 September, 2011	N/A
Ricardo Arjona	2 & 3 August, 2012	N/A
Joaquín Sabina & Joan Manuel Serrat	24 November 2012	N/A
Alejandro Sanz	23 April 2013	N/A
Miguel Bosé	13 June 2013	N/A
Mägo de Oz, Kraken, Krönös, Bürdel King & Rata Blanca	3 November 2013	N/A
Fito Páez	15 November 2013	N/A
Epica, Angra & Mägo de Oz	13 June 2013	N/A
Arctic Monkeys & The Hives	4 November, 2014	N/A
Ska-P & I.R.A.	15 November 2014	N/A
Deep Purple & The Black Cat Bone	21 November, 2014	N/A
Fonseca	28 September 2018	N/A
Juanes, Miguel Bosé & Sebastian Yatra	3 October 2018	N/A
Zoé & Nicolás y los Fumadores	6 October 2018	N/A
Sting & Shaggy	21 October 2018	N/A
Maluma, LV5 & Dj Eddie Bermúdez	10 November 2018	14.000
Lenny Kravitz	23 March 2019	14.000
Slash	5 May 2019	14.000
Raphael	13 March 2020	5.000
Miley Cyrus	21 March 2022	11.000
Kiss	7 May 2022	12.000
Karol G	22 May 2022	14.000
TINI	25 August 2022	5.000
Rosalía	31 August 2022	9.000
Demi Lovato	7 September 2022	7.000
NCT 127	January 25, 2023	6.000
Alicia Keys	11 May 2023	14.000
Måneskin	24 October 2023	10.000
Maná	10-13 April 2024	28.000
Niall Horan	9 October 2024	
NCT DREAM	31 August 2024	
Kylie Minogue	19 August 2025	
Doja Cat	15 February 2026	
Kali Uchis	18 February 2026	
Rosalía	16 July 2026	
TINI	18 September 2026	
Robbie Williams	20 September 2026	
Soy Luna	27 October 2026	

== See also ==
- List of indoor arenas in Colombia
- Simón Bolívar Park
- Bogotá
- Corferias
- Arena Vicente Fernández Gómez
