= Movistar Arena (TransMilenio) =

Bus rapid transit station in Bogotá, Colombia

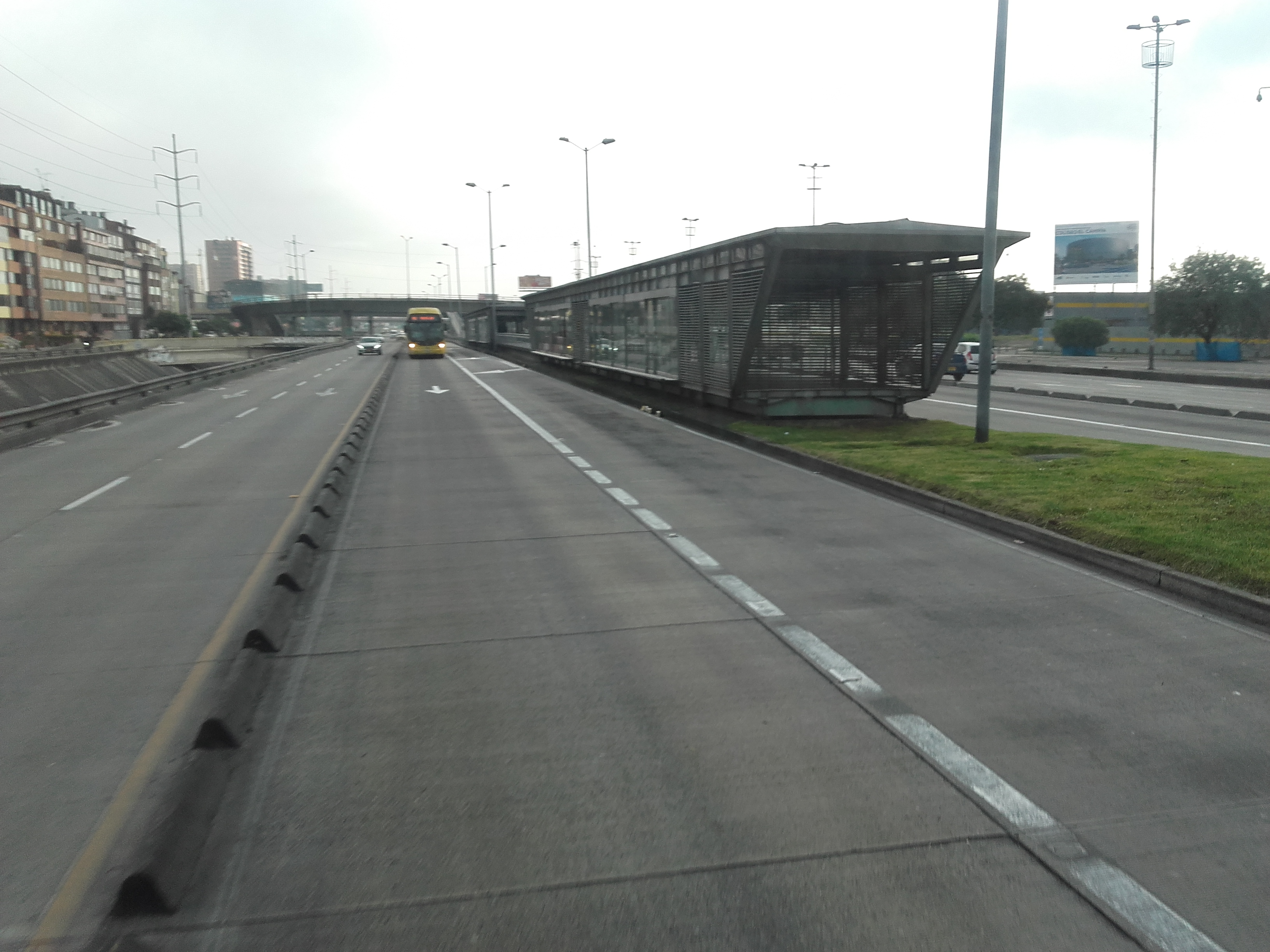

General information
- Location: Teusaquillo, Bogotá; Colombia
- Coordinates: 4°39′02″N 74°04′42″W

History
- Opened: 1 July 2005

Services
Preceding station	TransMilenio	Following station
7 de Agosto towards La Castellana	E	Campín - Universidad Antonio Nariño towards Tygua - San José
Location

Movistar Arena is a bus rapid transit station in Bogotá, Colombia. It is part of the TransMilenio mass-transit system of Bogotá, Colombia, opened in the year 2005.

== Location ==
The station is located north of downtown Bogotá, specifically on Avenida NQS with Calle 63.

== History ==
This station opened in 2005 as part of the second line of phase two of TransMilenio construction, opening service to Avenida NQS. It serves the demand of Calle 63, and surrounding neighborhoods.

The station is named «Movistar Arena» due to its proximity to the multipurpose arena, which itself lies directly to the north of the stadium with the same name.

The station had the name Coliseo until September 28, 2018, when it changed to its current name after the remodeling of the place for events and the corresponding sponsorship.

== Station Services ==
=== Old trunk services ===
Services rendered until April 29, 2006
Kind	Routes	Frequency
Current		Every 3 minutes on average

=== Trunk services ===
Services rendered since April 29, 2006
Kind	Routes to the North	South Routes
Local	4 7	4 7
Express Monday to Saturday all day	B72	H61
Express on Sundays and holidays	C96	G96

=== Feeder routes ===
This station does not have connections to feeder routes.

=== Inter-city service ===
This station does not have inter-city service.

== See also ==
- List of TransMilenio Stations
