= Coliseo Cubierto de Itagüí =

Coliseum in Itagüí city, Colombia

- Interactive map of Coliseo Cubierto de Itagüí
- Full name: Coliseo Cubierto de Itagüí
- Location: Itagüí, Colombia
- Coordinates: 6.1703°N 75.6056°W
- Capacity: 5,000

Construction
- Renovated: 2010

Tenant
- Itagüí

The Coliseum of Itagüí (in Spanish Coliseo Cubierto de Itagüí) is a multi-use coliseum in Itagüí city, Colombia. It is currently used mostly for Futsal matches, on club level by Águilas Doradas. The coliseum has a capacity of 5,000 spectators.

== See also ==
- Itagüí
- Talento Dorado de Itagüí
