= Portal Eldorado (TransMilenio) =

Bus station in Bogotá, Colombia

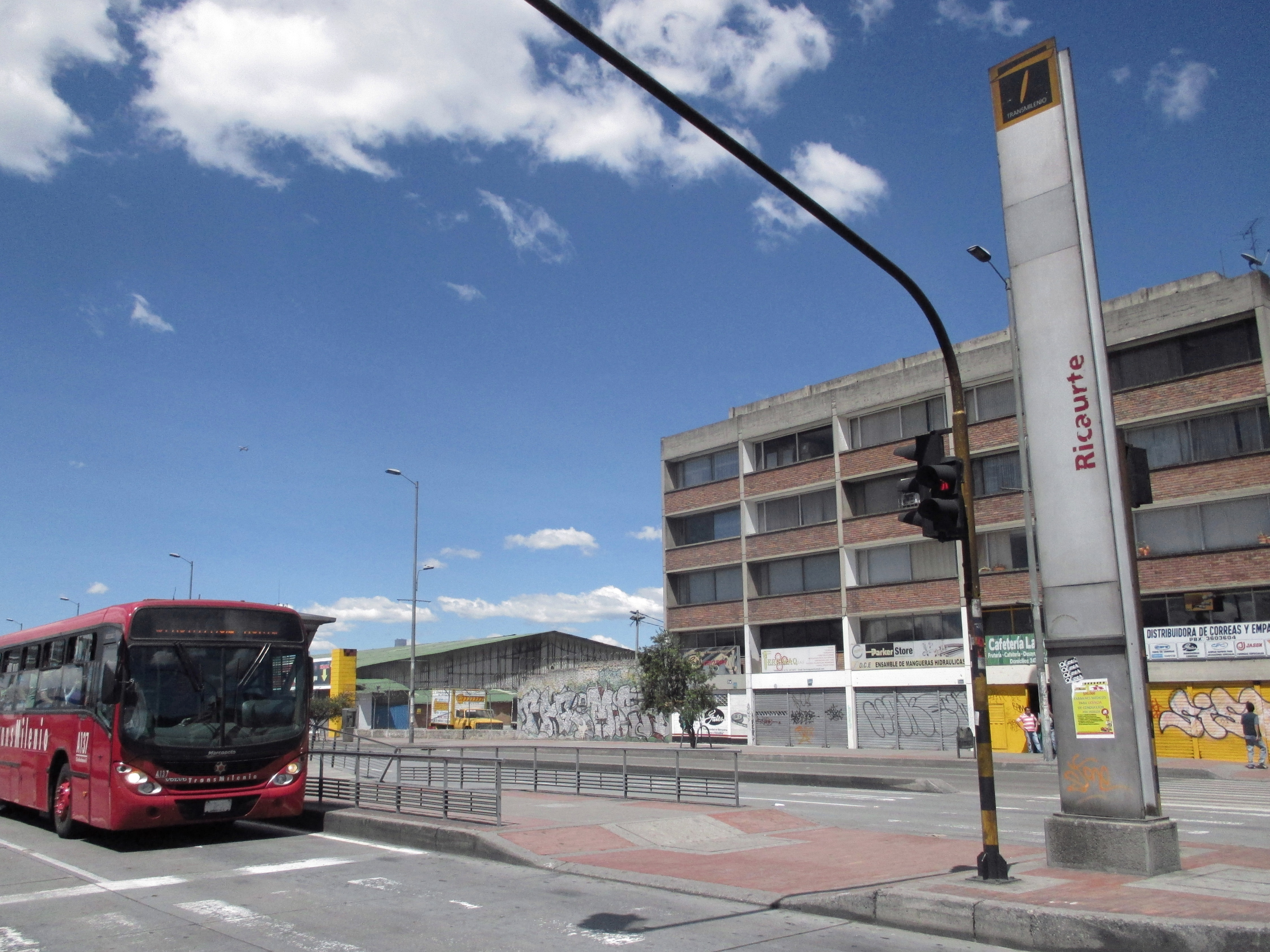

General information
- Location: Av.Calle 26 with Av.Carrera 86 and Transversal 93; Fontibón and Engativá; Colombia

History
- Opened: 30 June 2012

Services
Preceding station	TransMilenio	Following station
Modelia towards Universidades	K	Terminus

The Portal Eldorado, inaugurated in 2012, is one of the terminal stations of TransMilenio, the bus rapid transit system of Bogotá, Colombia.

== Location ==
The Portal Eldorado is located in the west of the city, on the Avenue El Dorado between the Avenue Ciudad de Cali and the transverse 93. It has accesses by pedestrian bridges located on These two ways.

It caters directly to the neighborhoods Santa Cecilia, Los Álamos and its surroundings. Nearby are the El Dorado International Airport, the Aloft Bogota Airport hotel, the Movich Buró 26 hotel, the Habiltel hotel, the main headquarters of Carvajal SA, the GlaxoSmithKline headquarters in Colombia, the Hipercentro warehouse Corona Dorado and Connecta business center, headquarters of several multinationals and visa offices for the embassies of Australia and the United States.

== Etymology ==
The Portal receives its name being the head station of the line Calle 26, and being located on the road axis of the same name. The Eldorado Avenue was baptized of this form since for a long time it was believed that the legend of Eldorado had its source in the muiscas rites of the lagoon of Guatavita, located about 40 kilometers from the city.

== Story ==
This station is part of Phase III of the TransMilenio system that began to be built in late 2009 and, after several delays related to corruption cases, began operations on Saturday 30 June 2012.

=== Current trunk services ===
Service as of 30 June 2012
Type	Northern Routes	Southern Routes	Ending Routes	Eastern Route	Frequency
All days			1	1	Every FIVE minutes
Express Monday through Saturday; All day	B16	L10 / G43 / H54	K10 / K16 / K43 / K54		Every two minutes
Express Monday through Friday; All day	B16		K16		Every two minutes
Express Sundays and holidays		L97	K97		Every 3–4 minutes

=== Dual services ===
Services rendered since 31 May 2014
Kind	Routes to the North	Routes to the South
Dual Monday to Sunday all day	M86	K86

=== Feeding services ===
To each side of the portal are located the stops of the feeder routes, which began to operate also on 30 June 2012

Platform North (Engativá)

- 16.1 circular to the neighborhood Tierra Grata.
- 16.2 circular to the sector of Engativá Center.
- 16.3 to the sector of Avenida Eldorado - Álamos.
- 16.4 circular to the El Muelle neighborhood.
- 16.5 circular to Villa Amalia neighborhood.
- 16.6 to the La Faena neighborhood.
- 16.14 to the Eldorado Airport.

Platform South (Fontibón)

- 16.7 to the La Estancia neighborhood.
- 16.8 to the free zone sector.
- 16.9 circular to the sector of Fontibon Center.
- 16.10 to the Villemar district.
- 16.13 to the sector of Avenida Cali - Hayuelos.

=== Complementary services ===
The following complementary route also works:

- 16.12 to the neighborhood Belén.

=== Circular Routes ===
From 8 August 2016 a circular route of the SITP enters the portal:

- TC06 circular to the El Refugio neighborhood.
