= Universidades (TransMilenio) =

Bus station in Bogotá, Colombia

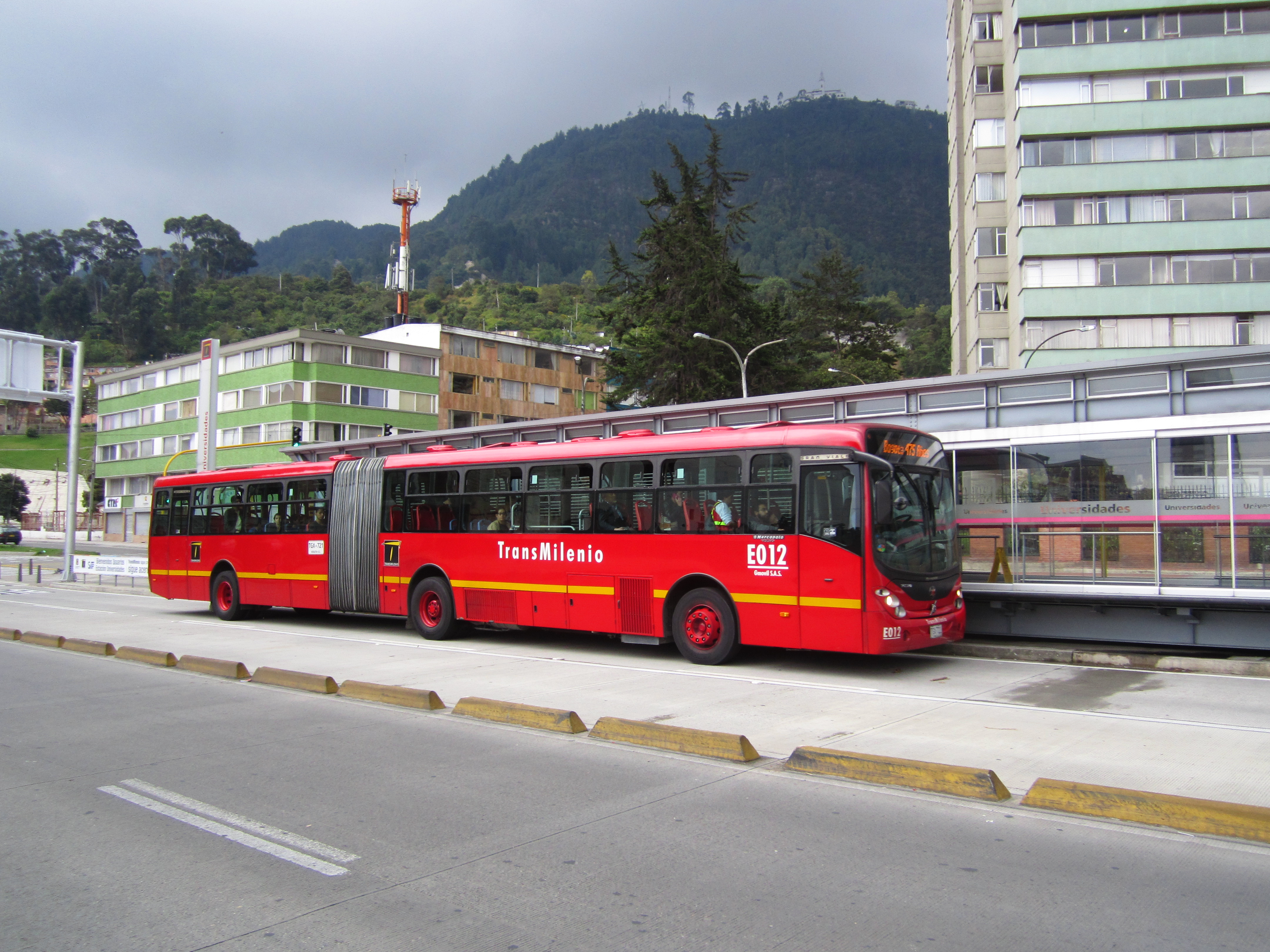

General information
- Location: Carrera 3 with Calles 18 and 19; Santa Fe, Bogotá; Colombia
- Line: Caracas Sur
- Platforms: 2

History
- Opened: April 27, 2013

Services
Preceding station	TransMilenio	Following station
Centro Memoria towards Las Aguas	J	Las Aguas towards Avenida Jiménez
Location

Universidades is a station on the TransMilenio mass-transit system of Bogotá, Colombia.

== Location ==
The station is located in the sector of the historical center of the city, more specifically on the race 3 between the City of Lima and the 22nd street. It is accessed in two ways: through a traffic light crossing located The street 22 and by means of a tunnel that connects it with the station of the Waters.

It serves the neighborhoods Las Aguas, Las Vegas and Las Nieves. Also it is used by students of the different university institutions located in that zone.

It also offers proximity to the hill of Monserrate, the historical center of La Candelaria, among others.

== Toponymy ==
The station gets its name given the proximity of several universities and educational institutions in the area of the station. Among them they are the Universidad Jorge Tadeo Lozano, the Universidad de los Andes (Colombia), Universidad de la Salle, Universidad de La Paz, Universidad del Rosario, Universidad de La Plata, and University of America, among others, Others.

== History ==
This station is part of Phase III of TransMilenio, which began to be built at the end of 2009 and, after several delays related to cases of corruption and the passage obstructed by the 26th Street due to the paralyzed work of the park Bicentennial, Was delivered on April 27, 2013.

== Station services ==
Services rendered since April 29, 2006
Kind	Routes to the West	Routes to the North
Local	1 6	
Expresses Monday to Saturday all day	D70	
Expresses Monday to Saturday; Evening peak hour		C73
Ending routes
Local	1 6	
Expresses Monday to Saturday all day	J24	
Expresses Monday to Saturday morning rush hour	J73	
Express Sundays and holidays	J95	

=== Complementary services ===
The following complementary route also works:

- 18.3 Circular Germania - Carrera Séptima - Tibabitá (Usaquén)

=== Inter-city service ===
This station does not have inter-city service.

== See also ==
- List of TransMilenio Stations
