= La Castellana (TransMilenio) =

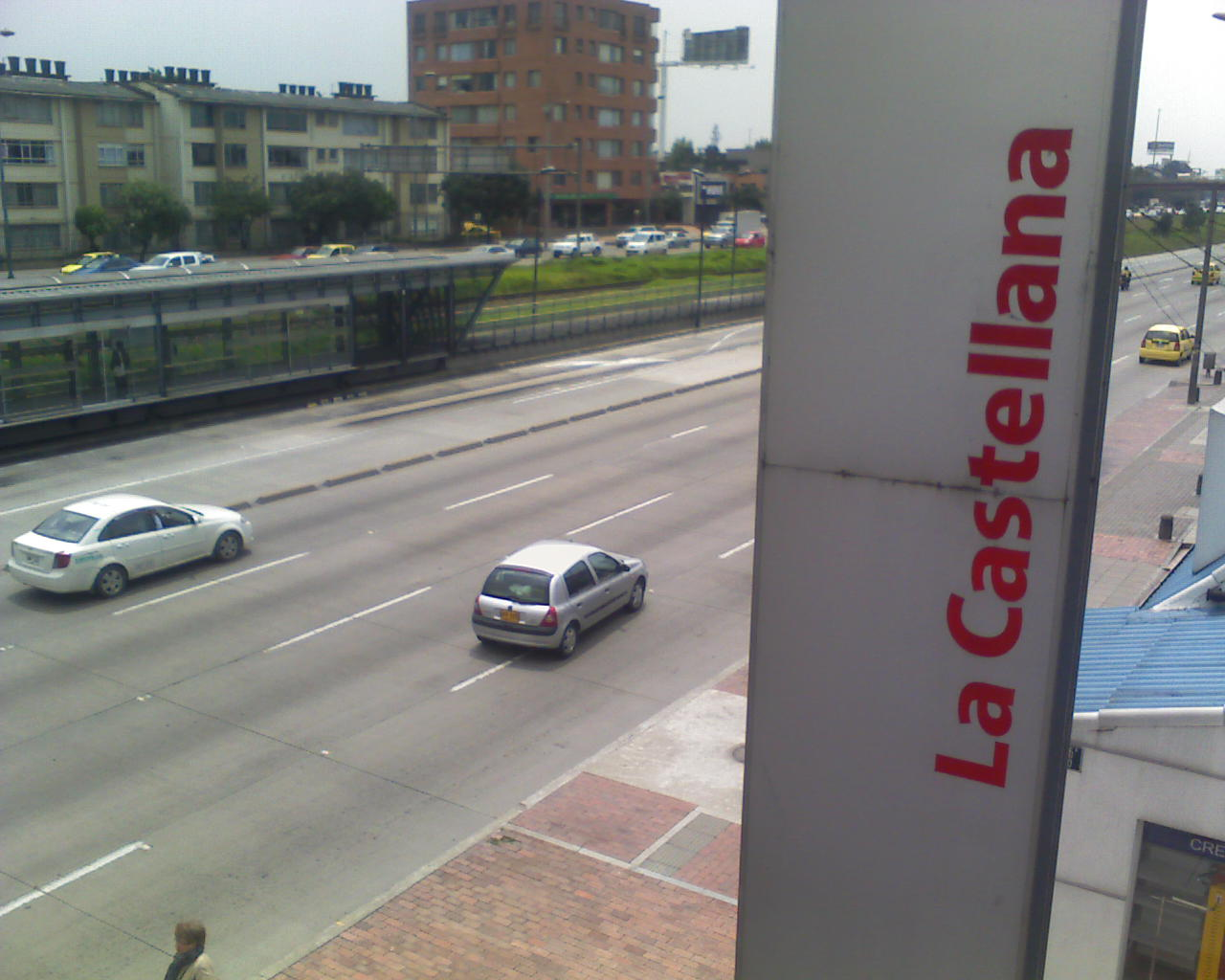

General information
- Location: Avenida NQS with Carrera 28 / Calle 86A; Barrios Unidos; Colombia

History
- Opened: 2005

Services
Preceding station	TransMilenio	Following station
Calle 100 towards Terminal	B	NQS Calle 75 towards Héroes
Calle 100 towards La Castellana	E	NQS Calle 75 towards Tygua - San José
Location

The simple-station La Castellana is part of the TransMilenio mass-transit system of Bogotá, Colombia, opened in 2000.

== Location ==
La Castellana is located in northern Bogotá, specifically on Avenida NQS with Carrera 28/Calle 86A.

== History ==
In 2005, when the second trunk of phase 2 of the system, the NQS trunk, was put into operation, this station was put into operation. In this season, the inauguration ceremony of the NQS Troncal trunk was carried out, which was attended by President Álvaro Uribe Vélez, since at that moment the trunk had not yet been completely terminated (it was operative until Santa Station Isabel).

It is one of the stations of the system, next to the Gold and Water Museum, which does not have an easy route service because, on August 1, 2008, the B5-G5 service changed its route to Calle 80, omitting this station.

On the night of April 9, 2013, attacks against this station of the system were recorded. On that occasion, the stations Avenida Chile and La Castellana de la Troncal NQS were destroyed, where they left $ 22 million pesos in losses. The station is named La Castellana due to its proximity to the educational center of the name, the neighborhood in which it is located, and the famous Teatro de La Castellana, which is located a few blocks away.

== Station services ==
=== Old trunk services ===
Services rendered until April 29, 2006
Kind	Routes	Frequency
Current		Every 3 minutes on average
Express	Expreso 150	Every 2 minutes on average

=== Main line service ===
Service as of April 29, 2006
Type	Northern Routes	Southern Routes	Frequency
Express Monday through Saturday; All day	B12 / B72	G12 / H72	Every two minutes
Express Monday through Friday; Mixed service, rush and non-rush	B28	F28	Every two minutes
Express Sunday and holidays	B90	G90	Every 3–4 minutes

=== Feeder routes ===
This station does not have connections to feeder routes.

=== Inter-city service ===
This station does not have inter-city service.

== See also ==
- Bogotá
- TransMilenio
- List of TransMilenio Stations
