= Tygua - San José (TransMilenio) =

Bus stop in Bogotá, Colombia

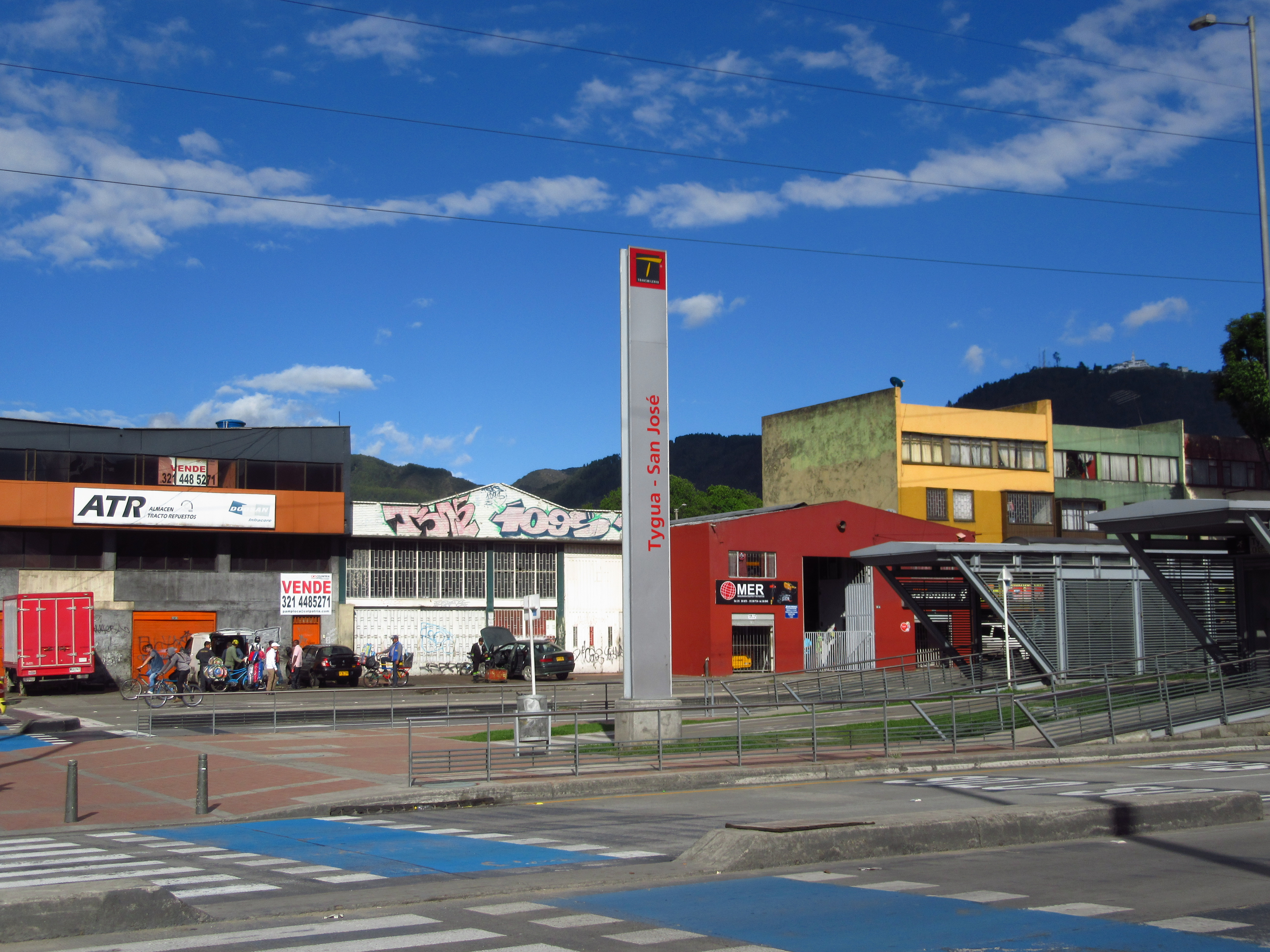

General information
- Location: Av.Calle 6 with Carreras 18 and 19; Los Mártires
- Line: NQS Central
- Platforms: 4

History
- Opened: November 7, 2015

Services
Preceding station	TransMilenio	Following station
Guatoque - Veraguas towards La Castellana	E	Terminus
Location

The simple station without exchange Tygua - San José, forms part of the TransMilenio mass transit system of Bogotá inaugurated in the year 2000.

== Location ==
The station is located in the center-east sector of the city, more specifically on the Avenue of the Comuneros between Carreras 18 and 19.

Serves the demand of the neighborhoods La Estanzuela, El Progreso and its surroundings. The area is predominantly residential.

== Origin of the name ==
The word Tygua means eagle in the language Muisccubun. This word was taken in honor of the coat of arms of Bogotá, in whose coat of arms the image of this bird is adopted, the second name San José receives it by the proximity with the Hospital San José.

== History ==
In 2012, when the phase III of the system was put into operation, the construction of the Sixth Street or Avenida los Comuneros trunk was started to establish a connection between the trunks of Carrera Tenth, Caracas Avenue and NQS. It was inaugurated in November 2015 and together with the one of Guatoque - Veraguas conform this trunk that is an extension of the NQS Central.

=== Main Services ===
Services rendered from November 7, 2015
Type	Routes to the North	Routes to the South	Routes to the East	Route to the West
Local	8			8
Express Monday to Saturday; All day	B72	G47H61	M47	
Express Monday to Saturday; Morning rush	B71			
Express Sundays and holidays		G47	M47	
