= Nicolás de Federmán, Bogotá =

Nicolás de Federmán
- Barrio
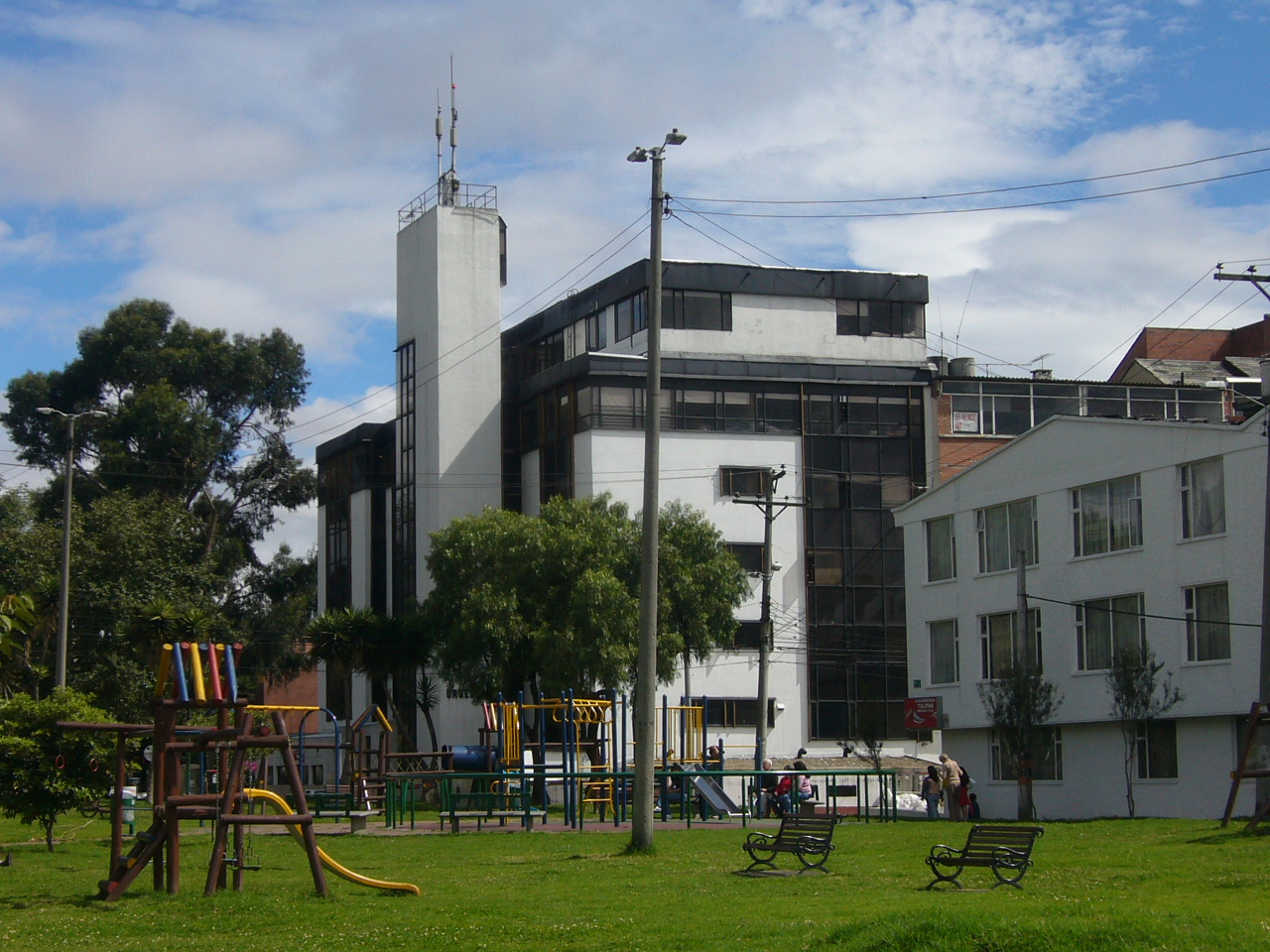
- Hospital Nicolás de Federmán
- Etymology: Nicolás de Federmán
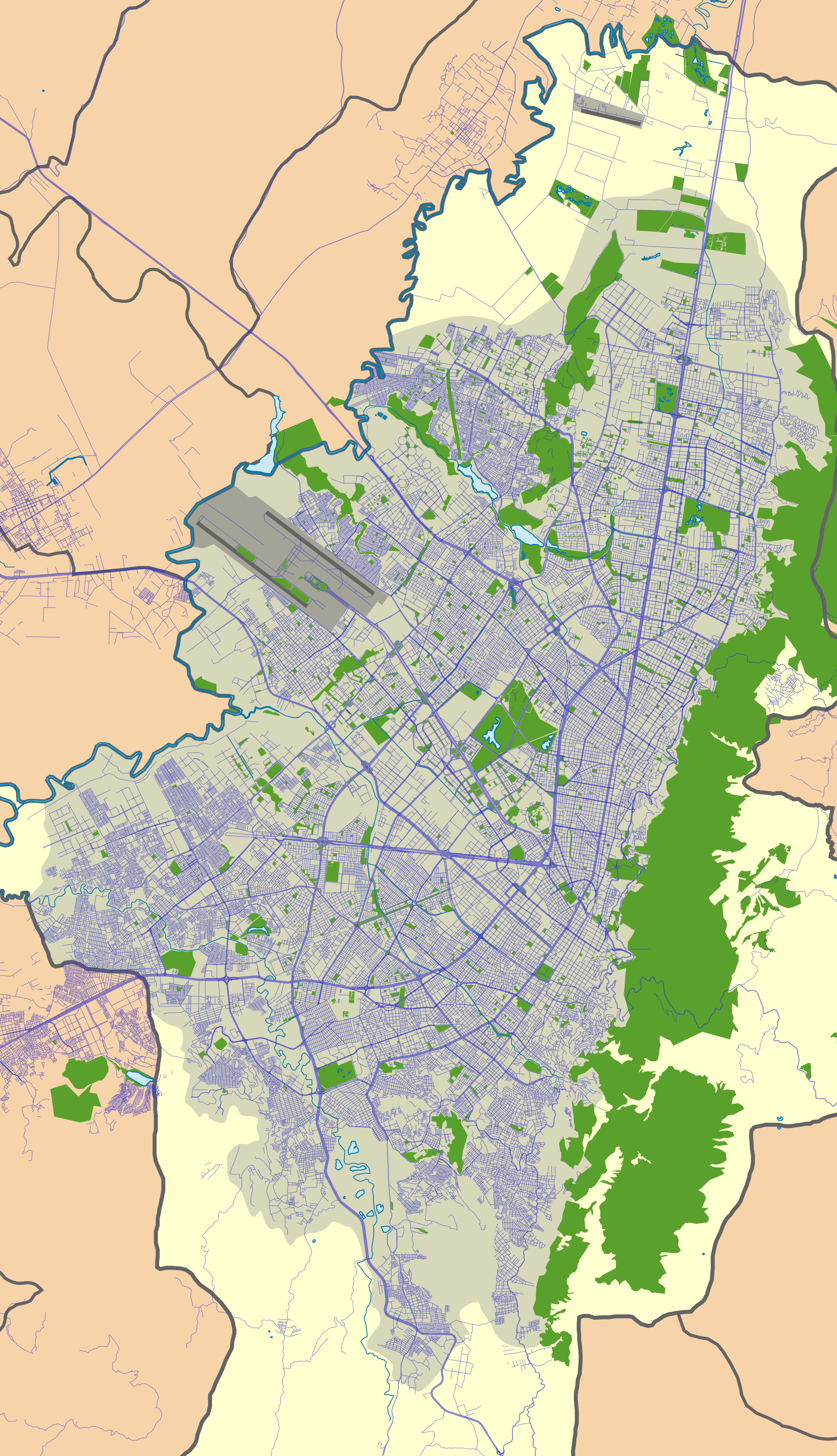
- Location in Bogotá
- Coordinates: 4°38′55.0″N 74°04′54.1″W
- Country: Colombia
- Department: Distrito Capital
- City: Bogotá
- Locality: Teusaquillo
- Elevation: 2,553 m (8,376 ft)

Nicolás de Federmán is a residential neighborhood located in Teusaquillo locality, near the geographical center of the city of Bogotá, Colombia. It is named after the prominent German conquistador of the 16th century Nikolaus Federmann, who took part in the re-founding of Bogotá on April 27, 1539 along with Spanish conqueror Sebastián de Belalcázar.

== Limits ==
- North: Calle 63
- South: Calle 53 (neighbouring with Ciudad Universitaria)
- West: Carrera 50 (neighbouring with Pablo VI)
- East: Avenida NQS or Carrera 30 (neighbouring with Galerías and Campín)

== Accessibility and transportation ==
Due to its residential nature, the neighbourhood's inner streets are not crossed by any transportation routes but instead Nicolás de Federmán is serviced by important routes all along its boundary ways such as Calle 63, Calle 53 and Carrera 50. The neighbourhood's location is otherwise privileged and public transportation quickly connects it with downtown Bogotá, and important northern and western zones of the city. Nicolás de Federmán is also serviced by the bus rapid transit system TransMilenio through Simón Bolívar, Movistar Arena and Campín stations.

== Sites of interest ==
Nicolás de Federmán has several parks and green zones, with the "Parque Central Federmán" as the most important of them. Located in the heart of the neighbourhood, it is also the cultural and health center because in its surroundings are located the following:

- Federmán Hospital
- Universidad Antonio Nariño
- "Corpus Christi" Catholic church
- A meetinghouse of the Church of Jesus Christ of Latter-day Saints, a Mormon religious building

== Gallery ==
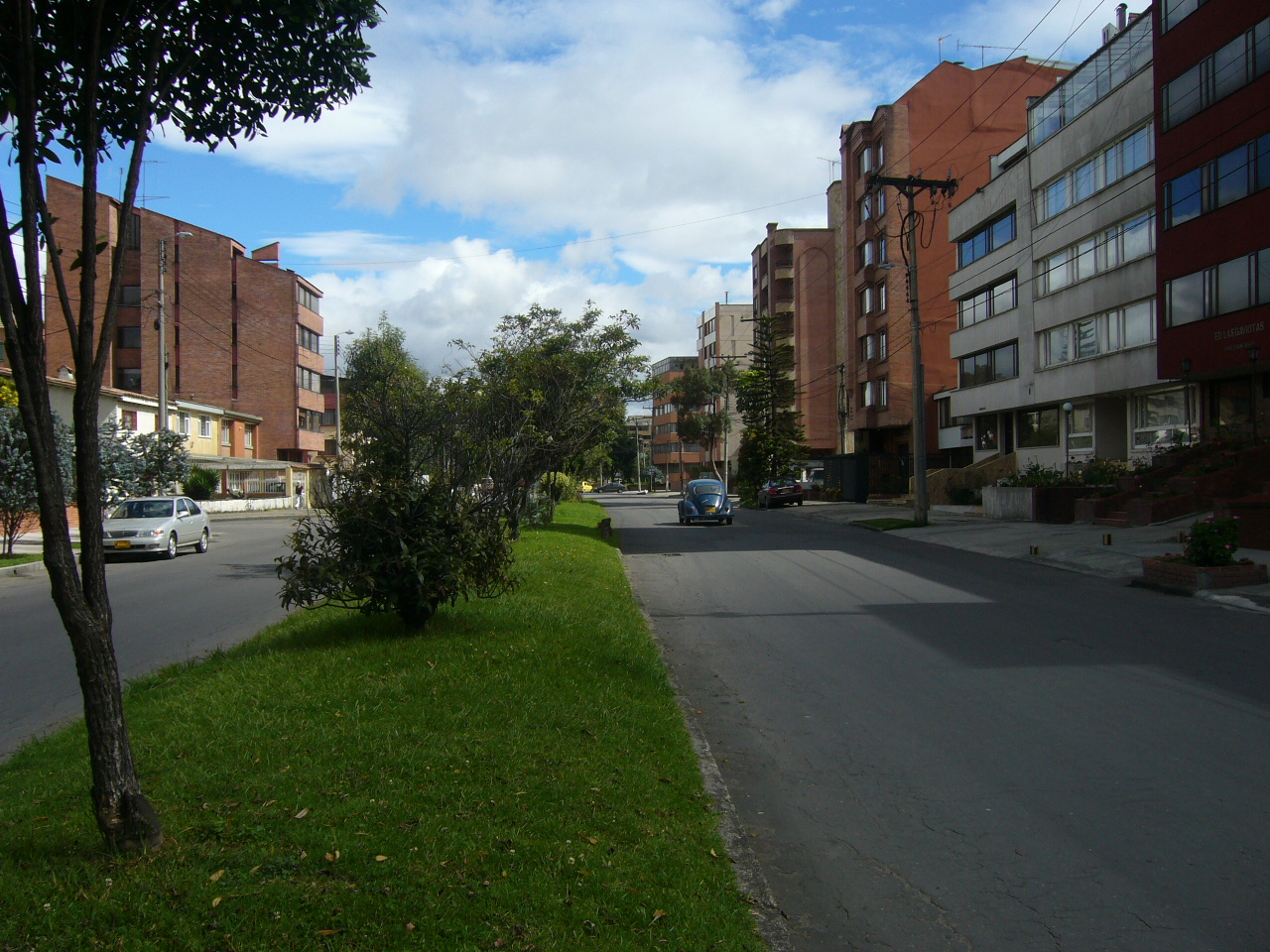
The neighbourhood along Carrera 45

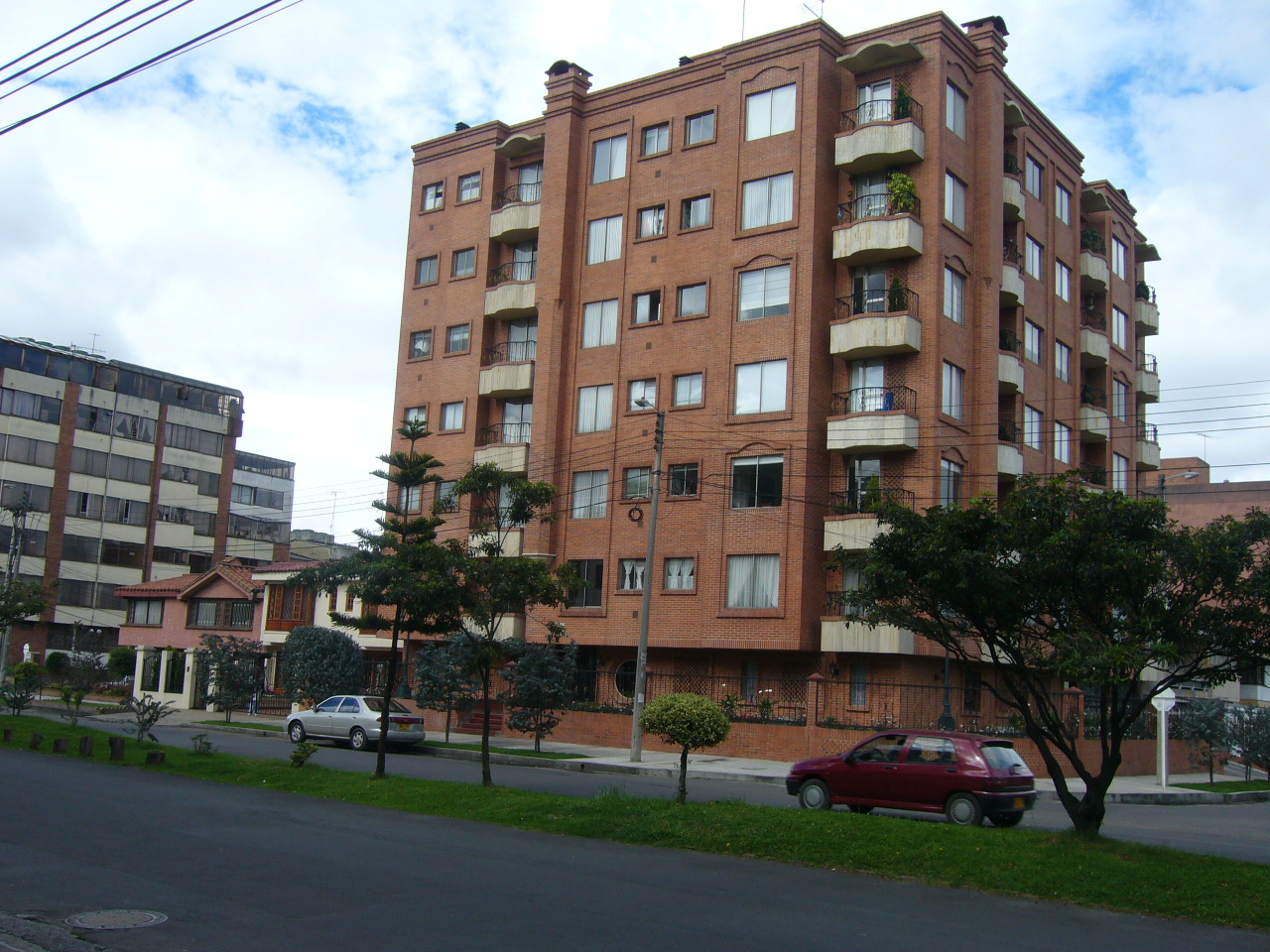
A typical residential building of Nicolás de Federmán

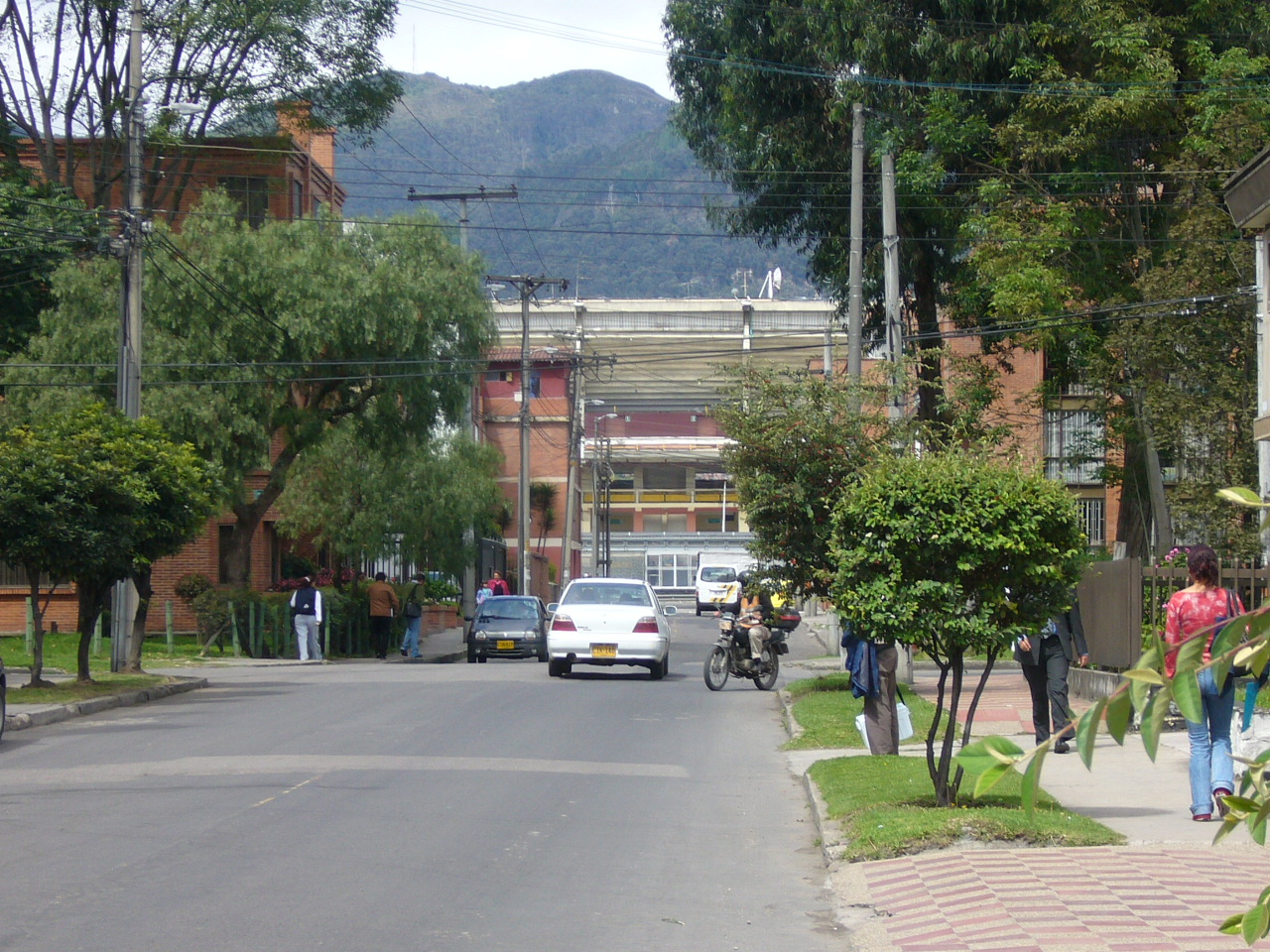
An overview of the 57th street with "Campín" stadium in the distance

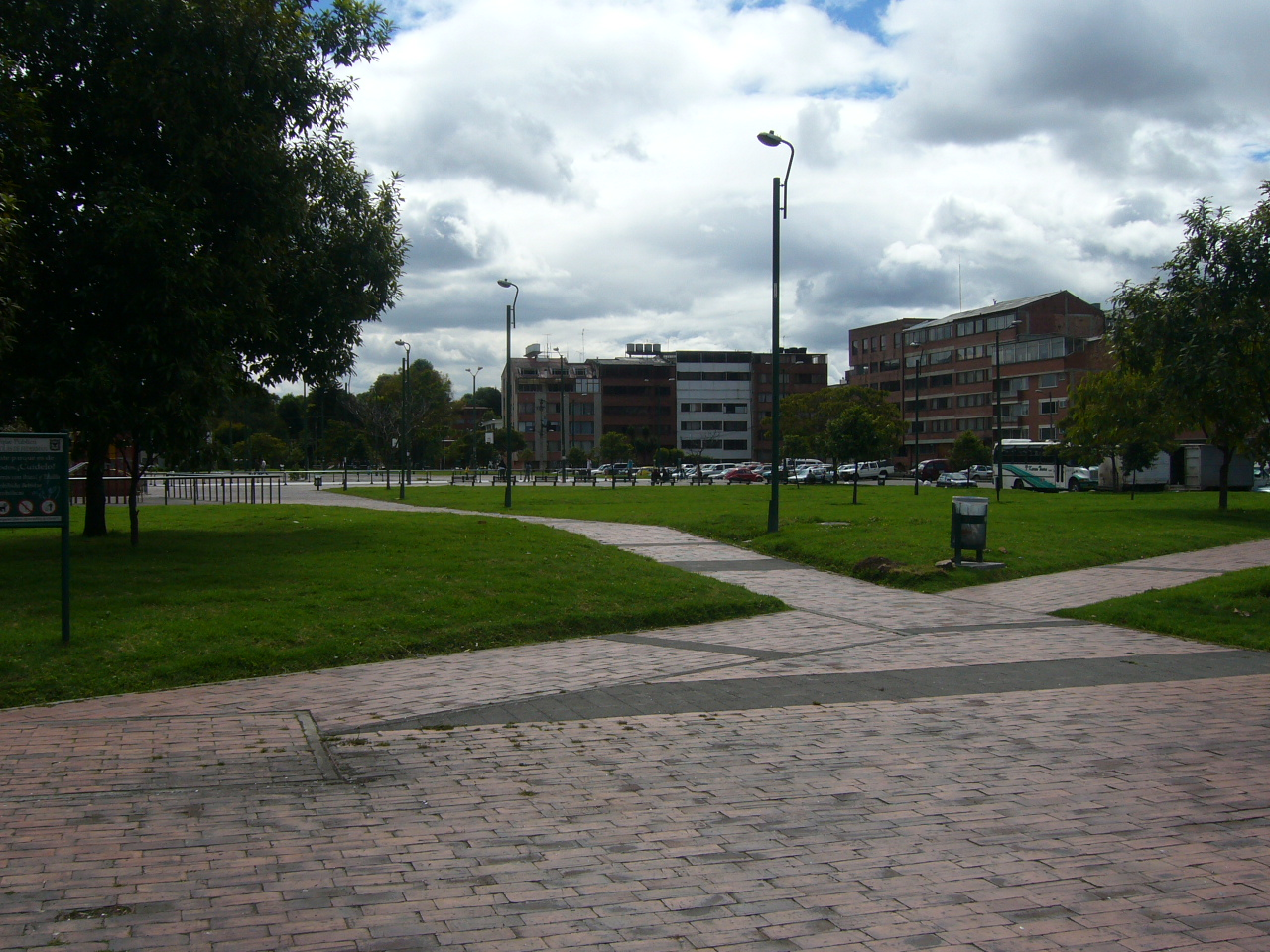
"Parque Central Federmán" as seen from its eastern border

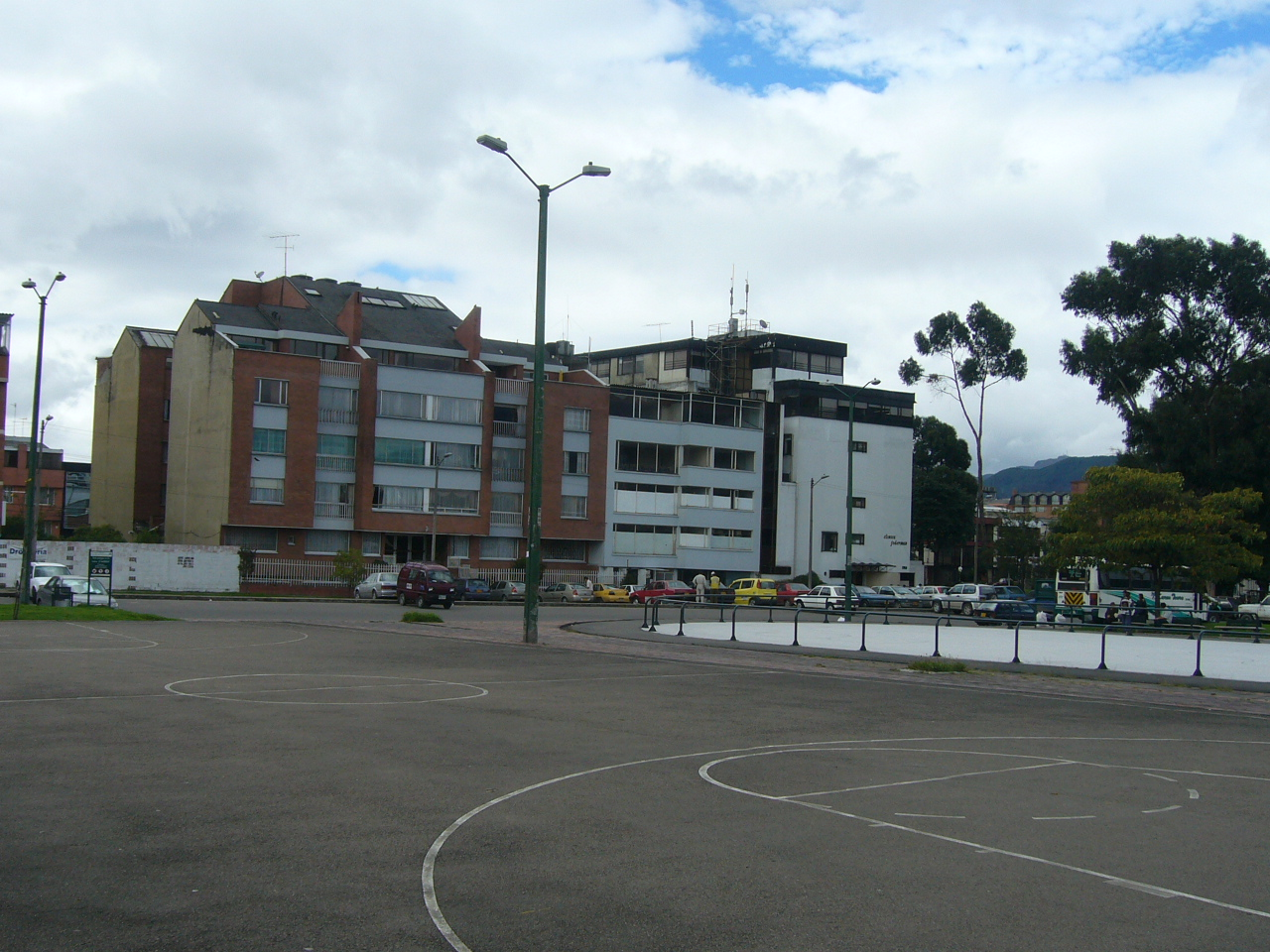
Basketball courts and skating course in "Parque Central Federmán"

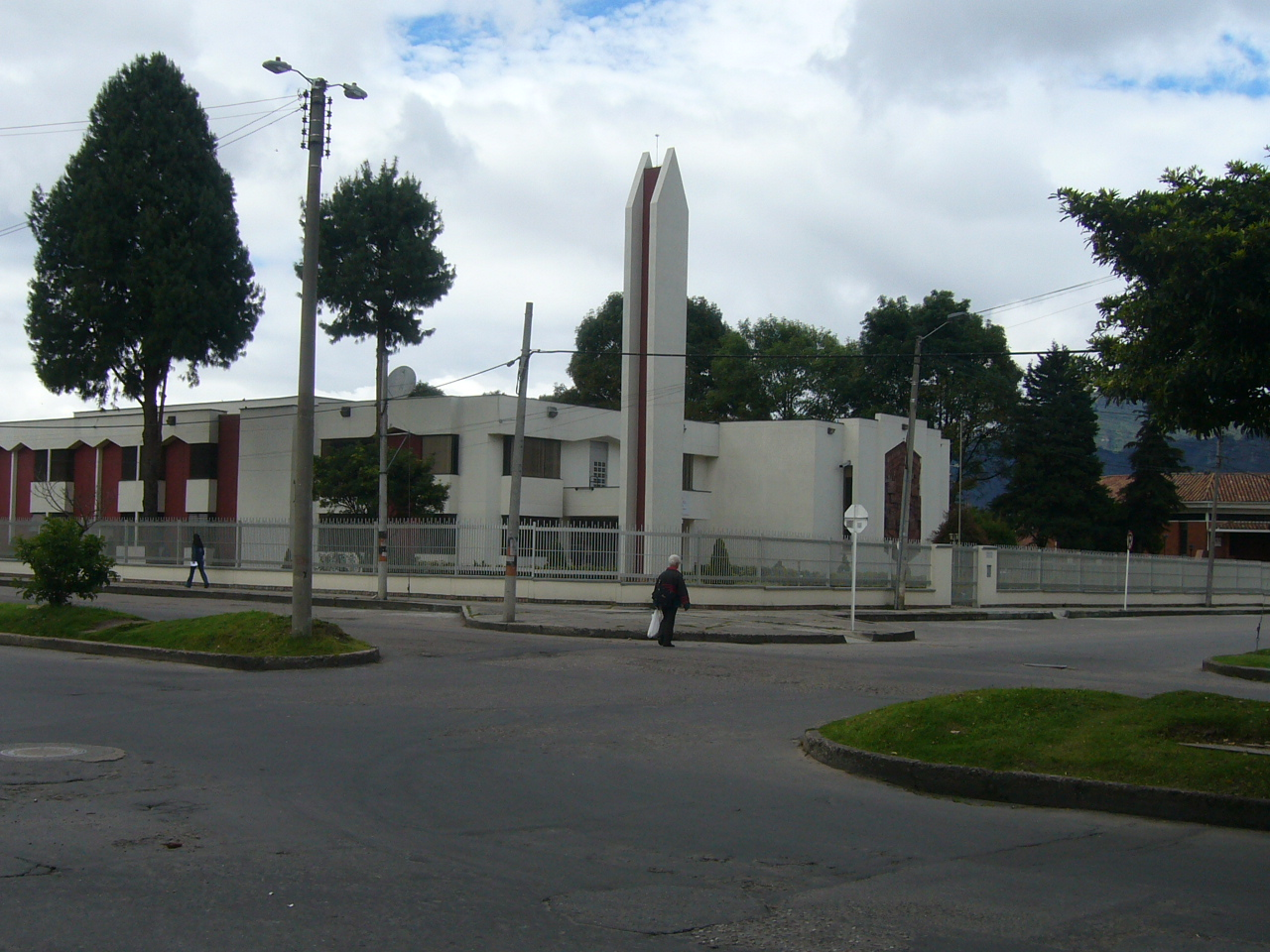
A meetinghouse of the Church of Jesus Christ of Latter-day Saints

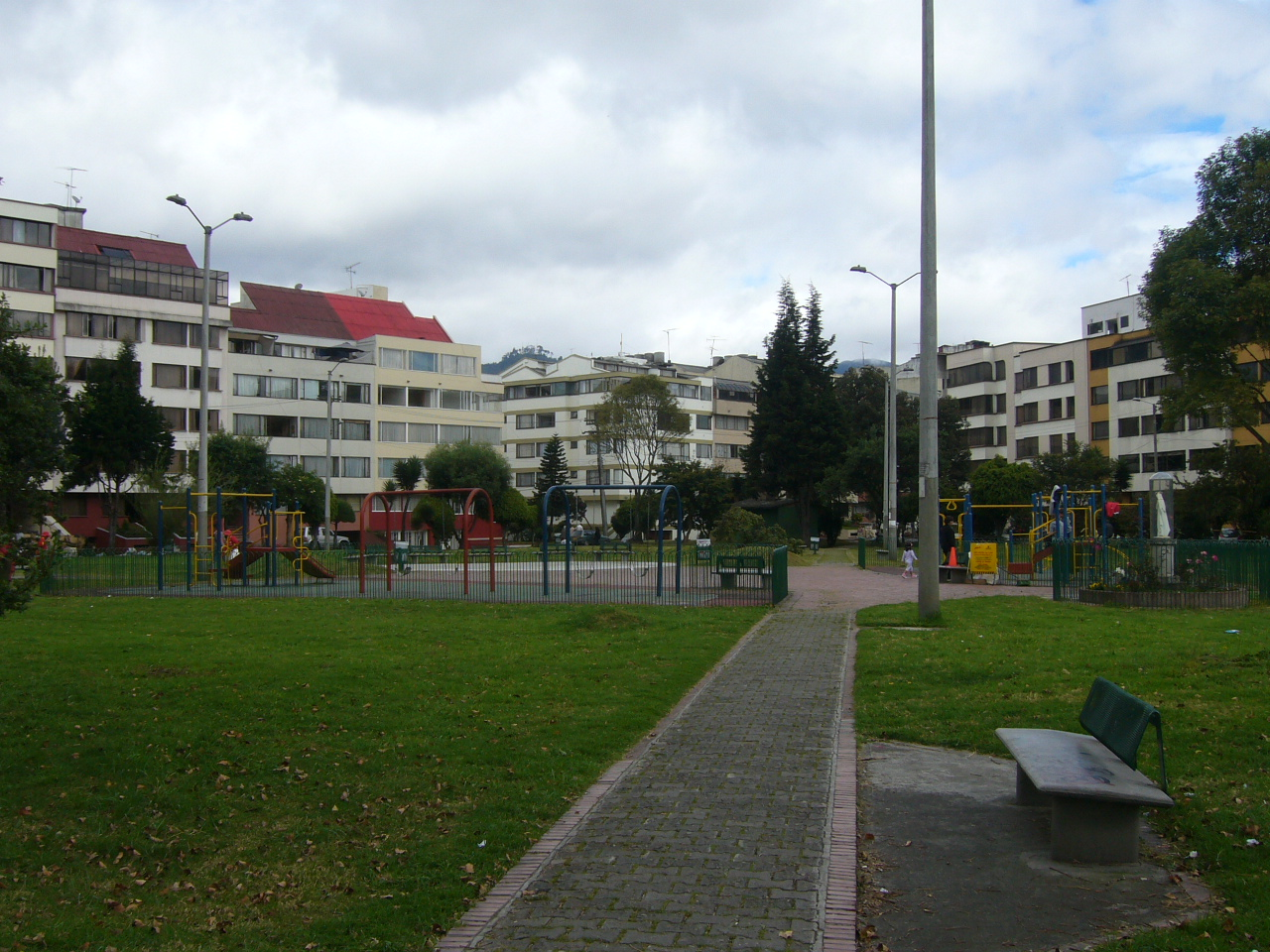
The South West Park near the Calle 53 and Carrera 50 junction
