= Teusaquillo =

- Locality of Bogotá

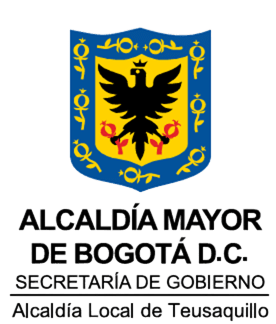
- Coat of arms

- Location of the locality in the city of Bogotá

- Location of the locality in the Capital District of Bogotá
- Coordinates: 4°40′14″N 74°05′35″W
- Country: Colombia
- City: Bogotá D.C.
- Neighbourhoods: List: Ciudad Salitre; Nicolás de Federmán (neighborhood)

Area
  - Total: 14.19 km^{2} (5.48 sq mi)
- Elevation: 2,600 m (8,500 ft)

Population (2007)
  - Total: 139,298
  - Density: 9,817/km^{2} (25,420/sq mi)
- Time zone: UTC-5 (Colombia Standard Time)
- Website: Official website

Teusaquillo is the 13th locality of Bogotá, capital of Colombia. It is located in the geographic center of the city, to the northwest of downtown Bogotá. This district is inhabited by middle and upper class residents. It is an urbanized locality with several green zones as parks, avenues, and the campus of the National University of Colombia. Most of the heritage buildings and houses of Bogotá are in this locality. It is located on the former site of an indigenous resguardo known as Pueblo Viejo (Old Village), which existed until the main urbanization phase of the 20th century.

== General information ==
=== Area ===
The total area of the locality is 14.19 square kilometres (5.48 sq mi), making the locality 11th of the 20 localities in terms of surface area.

=== Borders ===
- North: Calle 63, with the locality of Barrios Unidos
- South: Diagonal 22, Avenida El Dorado, and Avenida de Las Américas, with the localities of Los Mártires and Puente Aranda
- East: Avenida Caracas, with the localities of Chapinero and Santa Fe
- West: Avenida Carrera 68, with the localities of Engativá and Fontibón

=== Hydrology ===
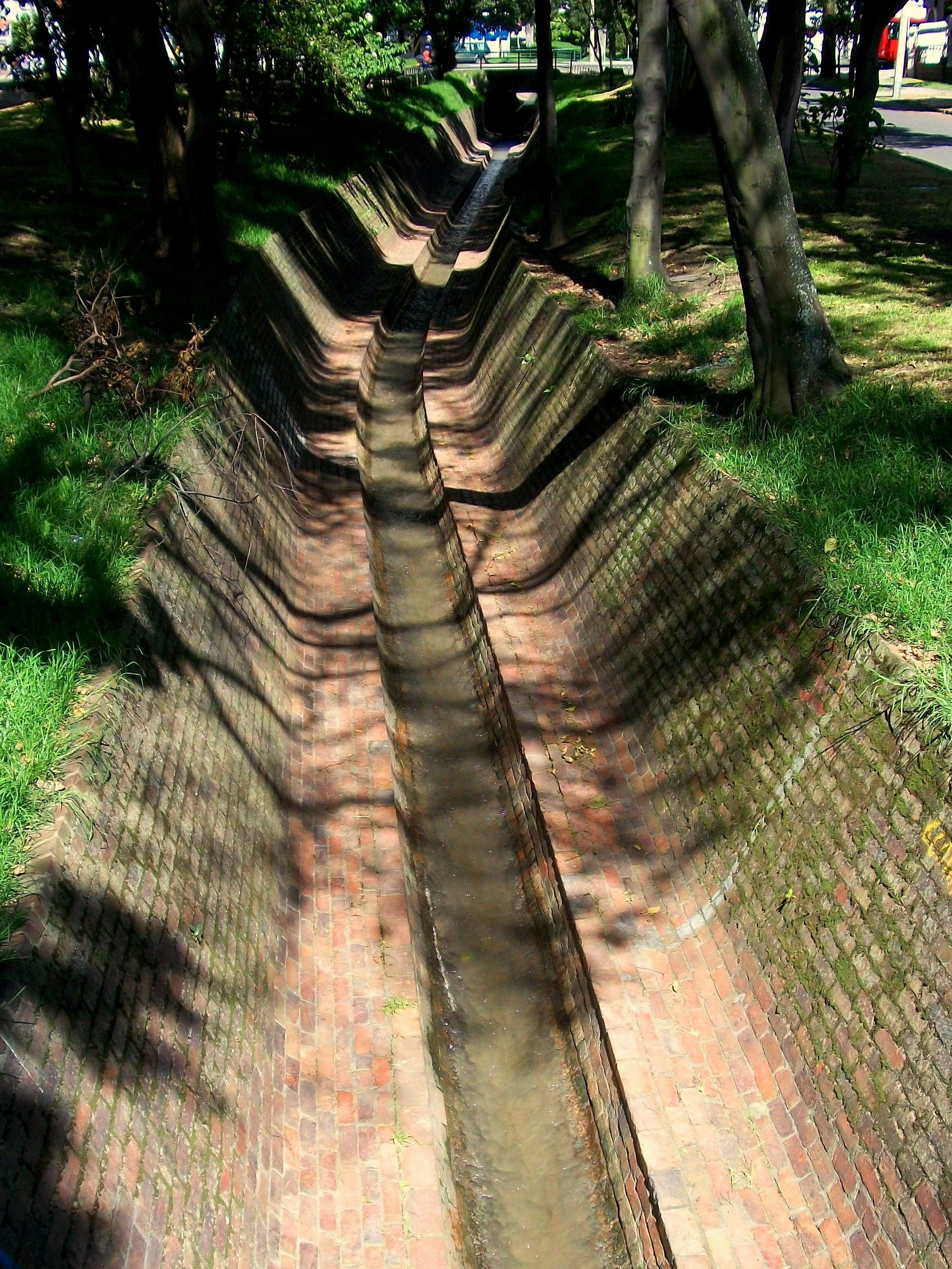
Canal Arzobispo

The locality is located in the Salitre and Fucha River basins. The Simón Bolívar park also includes several lakes. Teusaquillo is crossed by various canals, which form part of the rainwater management system of Bogotá. They are extensions of streams that are sourced by the Eastern Hills.

Salitre River Basin

- Canal Arzobispo, an extension of the Arzobispo River which runs through the locality until Carrera 30, at which point it continues as the El Salitre Canal
- Canal El Salitre, from Carrera 30, it runs in front of the National University campus, passing El Campín football staduym until Calle 63, where it enters the locality of Barrios Unidos

Fucha River Basin

- San Francisco Canal, which is an extension of the river of the same name, crosses the locality underground until Carrera 50

=== Topography ===
Teusaquillo is relatively flat due to its location on the Bogotá savanna. It slopes slightly to the northwest.

== History ==
=== Pre-Columbian, colonial, and post-colonial periods ===
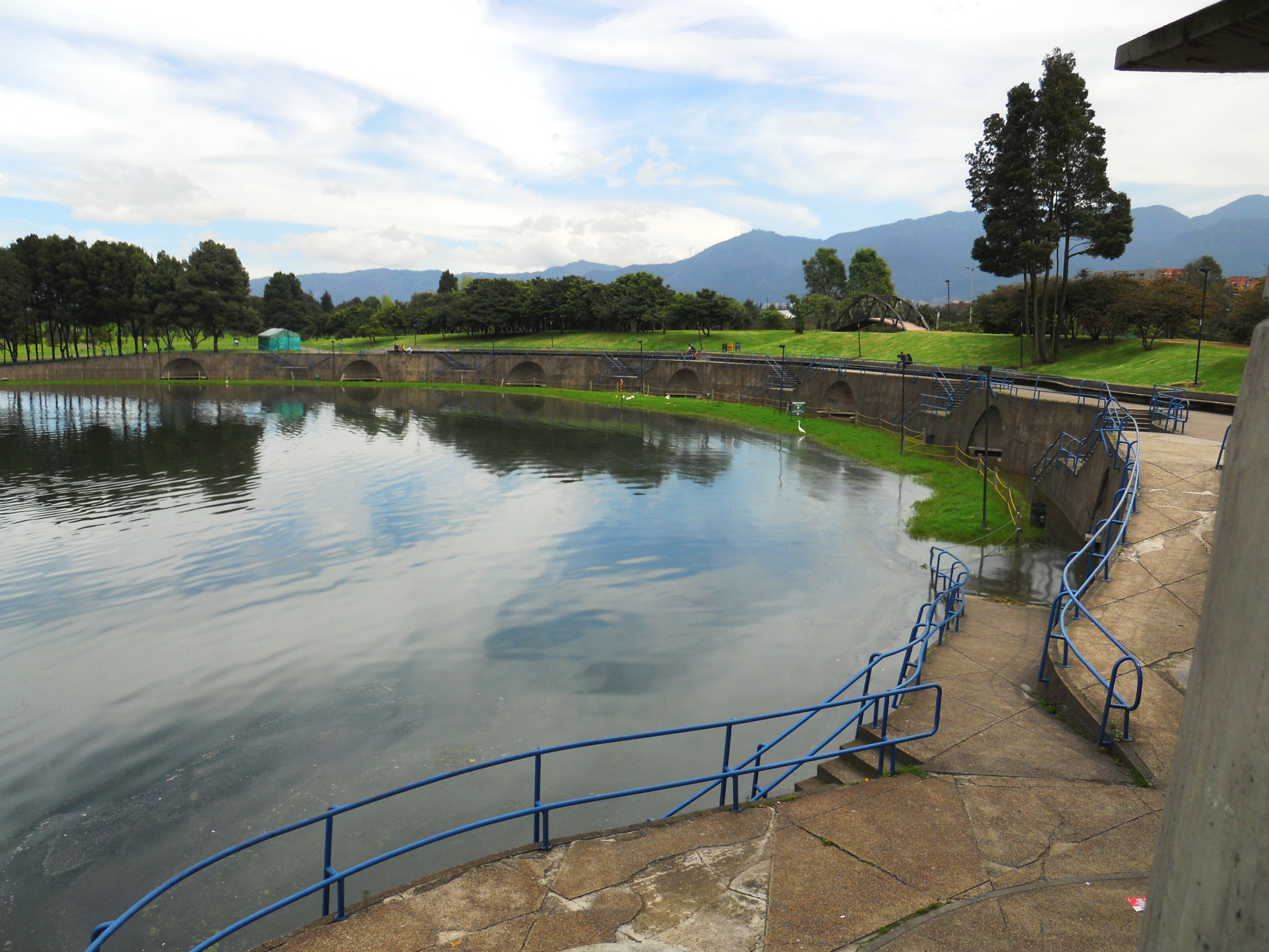
Lake in the Simón Bolívar Park

The name Teusaquillo, like the name of Bogotá itself, dates to pre-Columbian times. Similar to the city, the name corresponded to a different location that is located near the present-day municipality of Funza. That, in turn, was known as Bacatá and was the main settlement of the southern Muisca Confederation. Within the zipazgo was Teivzaquillo, Thibzaquivo, Teusacá or Tipizaquillo, the place of rest of the zipa; the leader of the Muisca in Bacatá. Teusacá in Muysccubun means "borrowed enclosure".

Located in the foothills of the Eastern Ranges of the Colombian Andes, the Bogotá savanna was discovered by conquistador Gonzalo Jiménez de Quesada. It was conquered by the Spanish who founded the town of Santafé de Bogotá on August 6, 1538, located in present-day La Candelaria. as the capital of the New Kingdom of Granada. At that time, the name Teivzaquillo fell out of use.

During the post-colonial period, the locality remained a rural area with a largely agrarian economy. It was known as Pueblo Viejo.

=== Modern times ===
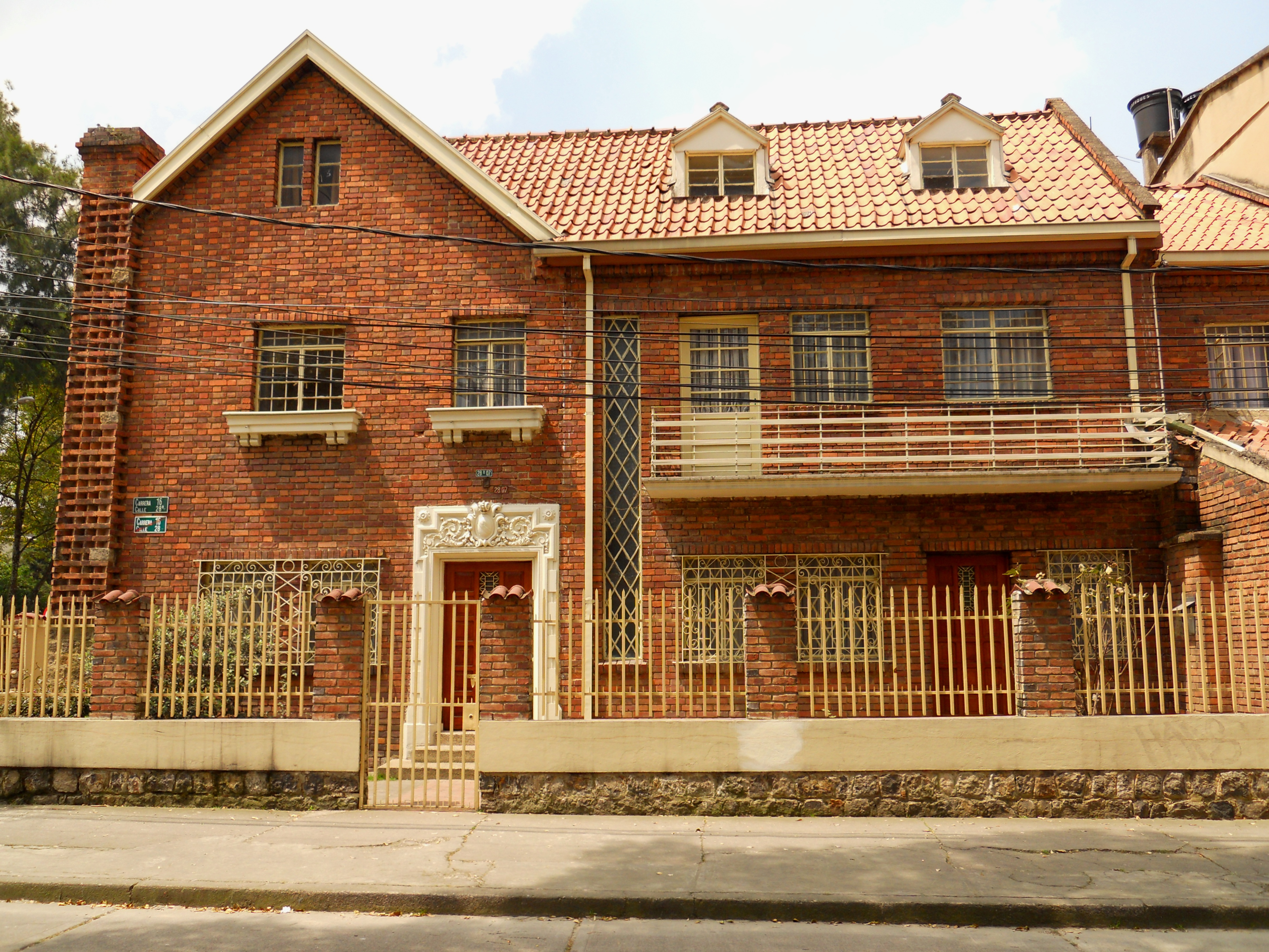
House in Teusaquillo

On September 7, 1902, Football Club opened the city's first football field in the Pueblo Viejo area and named it Teusaquillo, a Spanish translation of Teivzaquillo, as an homage to the indigenous Muisca who had lived in the area. That field saw the first game between Colombian football teams, the Red Team and the White Team, both belonging to Football Club. The following year, another field was built and named Marly. The area quickly became the capital city's football destination.

It was not until the 1920s that large-scale urbanization took place north of the Santa Fe neighborhood. As neighborhoods were constructed between Santa Fe and the still-small village of Chapinero, it was decided the area should be named Teusaquilo. The naming occurred in 1927 and the neighborhood quickly became one of the more modern and elegant of the era; a symbol of the city's flourishing after its fourth century of existence.

The neighborhood saw new architectural tendencies, especially the English Victorian style. Many of these buildings exist to the present day. It was considered the most fashionable neighborhood in Bogotá. Many notable Colombians lived there during its prime, including Jorge Eliécer Gaitán, Enrique Santos Montejo, Laureano Gómez, Gustavo Rojas Pinilla, and Mariano Ospina Pérez.

Construction on the National University began in May 1937 and was completed in 1945. In 1938, construction of El Campín football stadium was started on land donated by Luis Camacho Matiz. It was reconstructed in 1951 to hold 40,000 spectators and is the current home of the city's Millonarios and Independiente Santa Fe football clubs. In 1938, the area hosted the Bolivariano Games.

In 1961, work began on Simón Bolívar park. Included in the park land are several recreational centers, including a covered concert hall, a tennis center, and a smaller football stadium.

In 1972, the Special District of Bogotá was formed out of the Cundinamarca Department and the city was split into 16 localities. The Teusaquillo neighborhood and its surroundings were named the 13th zone of the capital city and its official borders were set.

With the visit of Pope John Paul II in 1986, a national shrine was built near the site of Pope Paul VI's 1968 visit to Colombia. These two visits make the locality the place most-visited by the papacy in all of Colombia.

The Special District of Bogotá became the Capital District with the ratification of the constitution of 1991. Teusaquillo was made a locality as part of this transition.

=== Today ===
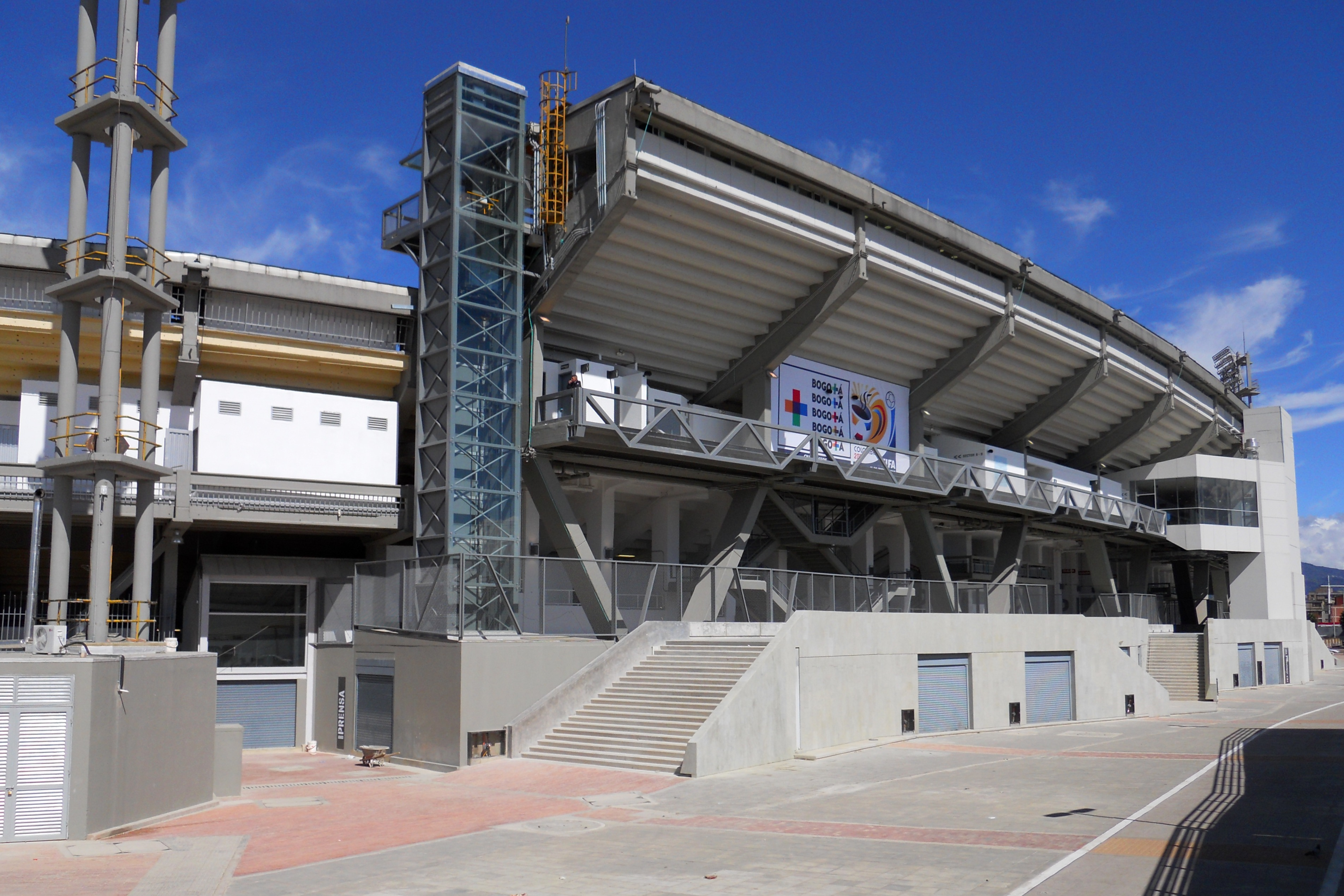
El Campín stadium

El Campín stadium was remodeled again in 2000 for the World Cup qualifiers and the 2001 Copa América. It was expanded to hold 48,310 spectators.

Additions were also made to Simón Bolívar Park, including:

- A large-events area with room for 150,000 spectators, the largest in the country
- The Virgilio Barco Mega-library, one of the largest in the city, built in 1999
- The Simón Bolívar Aquatics Complex, opened in 2004 for the National Games. It has a capacity for 4,000 people and is one of the most modern in South America, with an Olympic-sized pool.

== Population ==
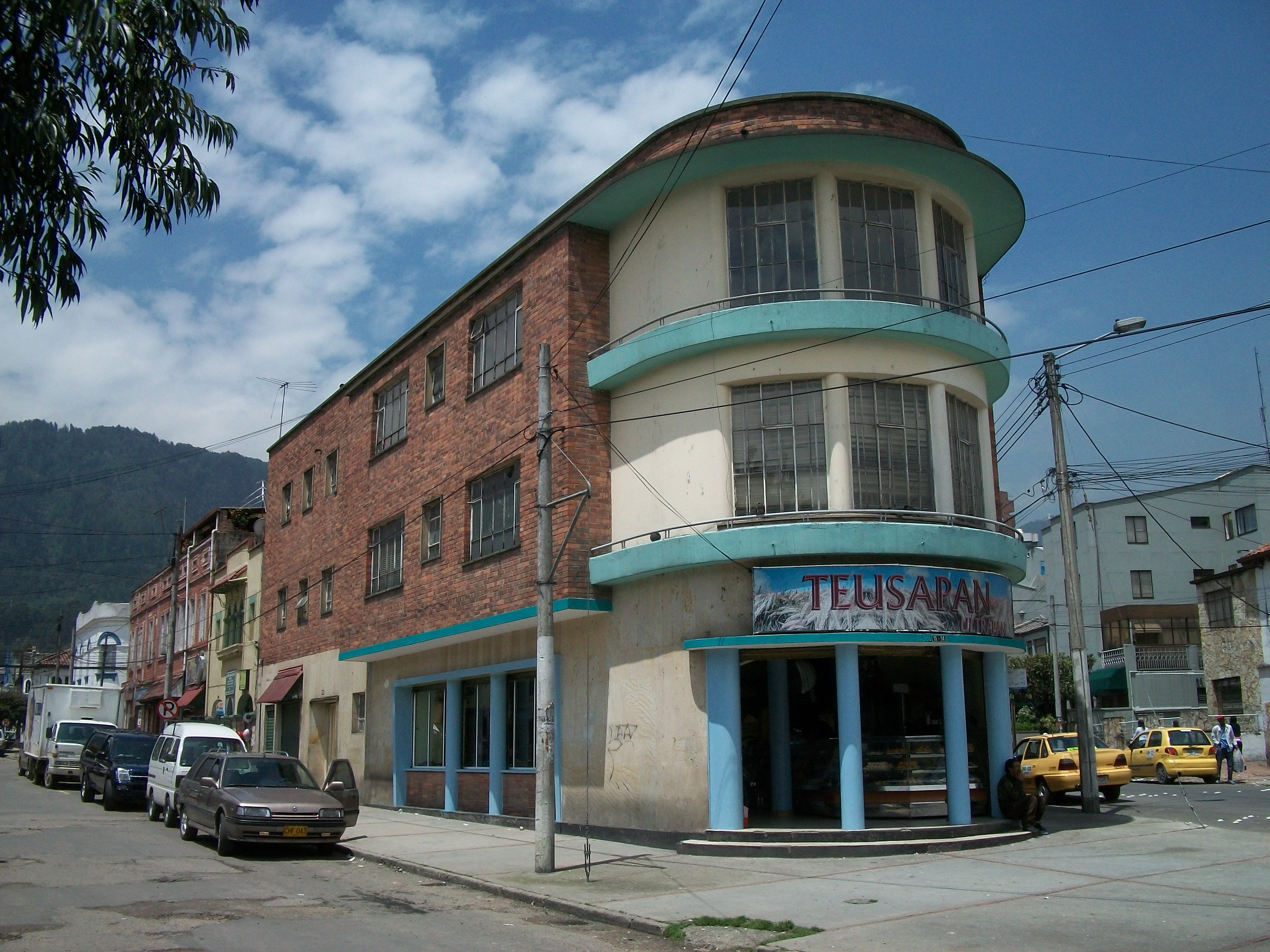
Building in Teusaquillo

According to the census of 1973, Teusaquillo had 127,521 inhabitants. Growth was slow over the next decade, and by 1985 the number was 132,501. By the time of the 1993 census, the population had dropped to 126,125 people, but the 1990s saw a population boom to 149,189. In 2005, the locality was home to 157,884 people, making up 2.5% of the total urban population of the city.

== Economy ==
While primarily a residential area, the locality has various commercial centers focusing on services and entertainment. The government and education sectors are among the largest employers in the area.

== Transportation ==
The locality is served by the following major roads: Avenida Carrera 68, Calle 63, Diagonal 53, Carrera 24, Avenida El Dorado, Avenida NQS, and Avenida Caracas. All of these routes are served by various fleets of private buses that run throughout all of the city.

It has two major bridges: one over NQS at Calle 63 and a more complex crossing at Avenida Carrera 68, leading to Engativá. There is also a large traffic circle at the border with Barrios Unidos, on which the Virgilio Barco Library and the Aquatic Complex are located.

The TransMilenio has two lines passing through the locality on Avenida Caracas and Avenida NQS, serving nine stations.

The locality has an extensive bike-path network, with over 5 kilometres (3.1 mi) within Simón Bolívar Park alone. A rail line crosses it and runs along Avenida NQS to the north.

== Points of interest ==
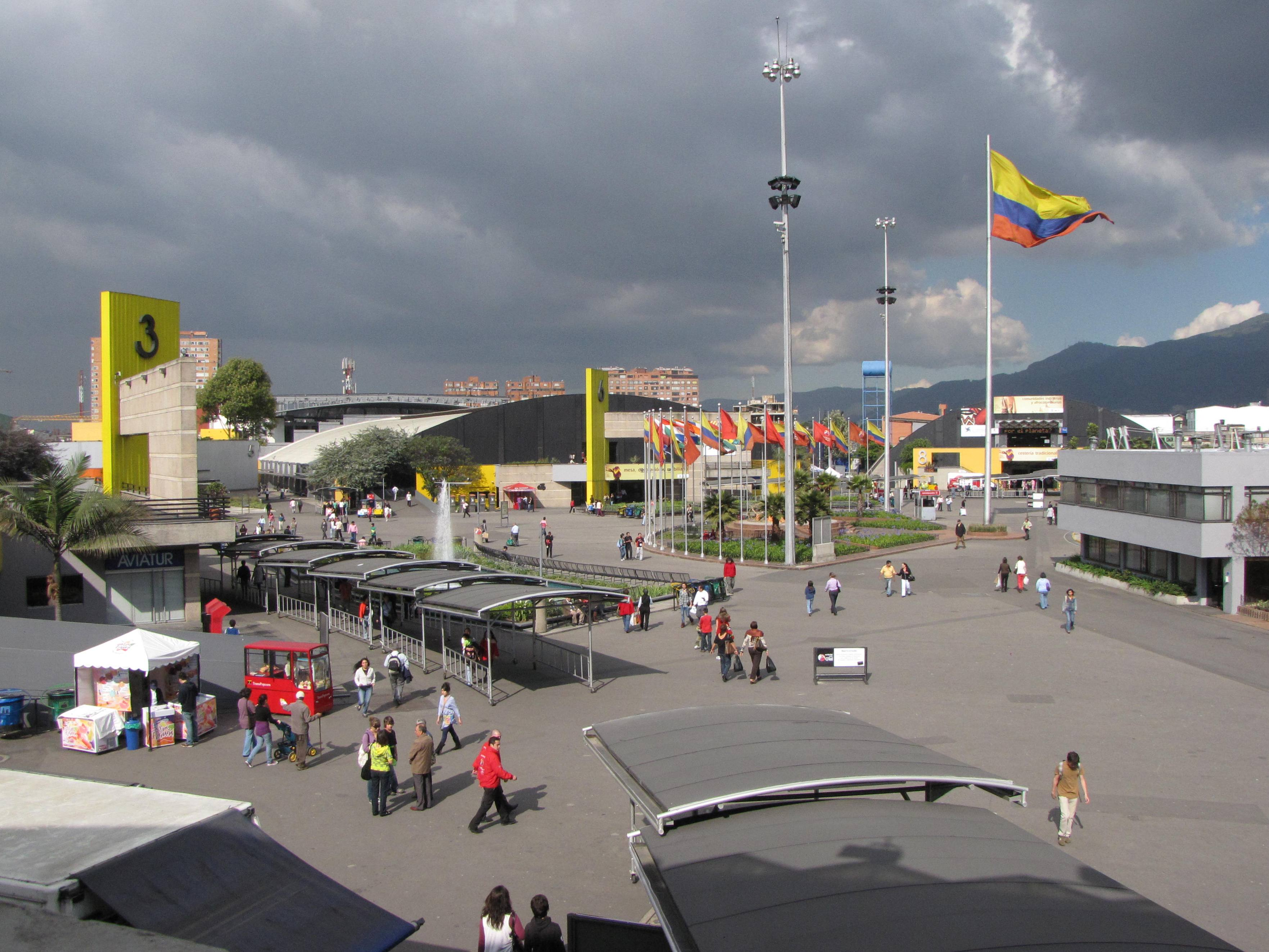
Corferias

While the major points of interest are Teusaquillo's parks and recreation centers, it is also home to several government departments. Included in these are the National Citizenship Registry (Registraduria Nacional), the National Statistics Department (DANE - Departamento Nacional de Estadíistica), the National Administration Center, the Solicitor General (Fiscalía General de la Nación), the Ministries of Education and Defense, and the Government of Cundinamarca department.

The Embassy of the United States takes up several city blocks of the Quinta Paredes neighborhood. One of the top-five US embassies in terms of size, it is an important employer in the area.

Centro Ferial de Convenciones, or CORFERIAS, is the largest exposition center in the country. With a large arch at its entryway, it serves as one of the city's cultural and commercial centers. Its uses include the International Book Fair, artisan expositions, and Bogotá largest polling station during elections.

Teusaquillo's parks are home to several festivals, including November's Rock in the Park festival and August's Summer Festival. The majority of the city's large concerts are held in the locality in three main venues: El Campín, the Sports Palace, and the parks.

Museo Gaitan, dedicated to the leftist political leader Jorge Eliecer Gaitan, assassinated in 1948. The museum contains information on his life, and Gaitan is buried on the premises.

El Parkway is a 2-square-kilometre (0.77 sq mi) park.

== Neighbourhoods ==
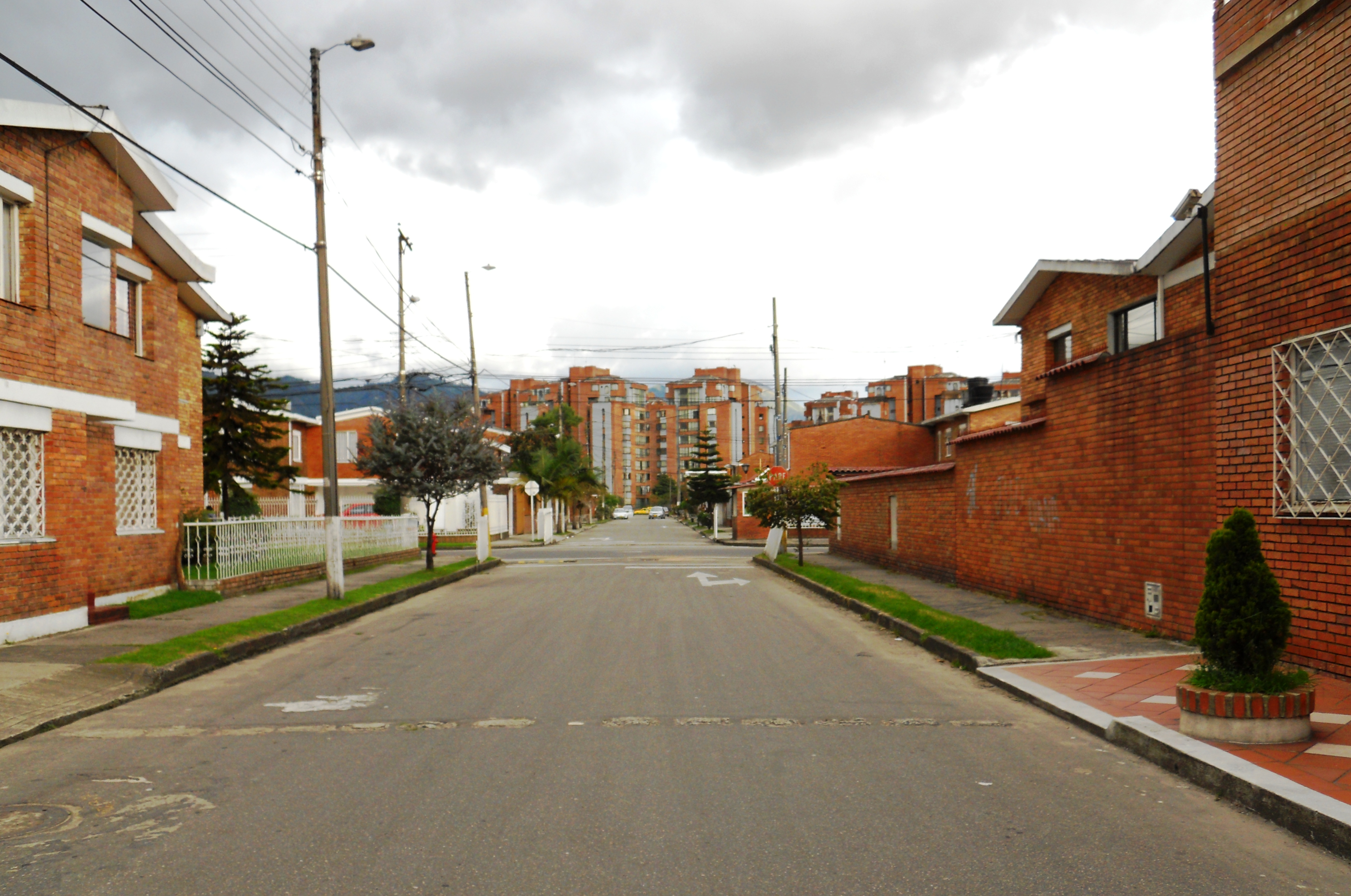
Street in La Esmeralda

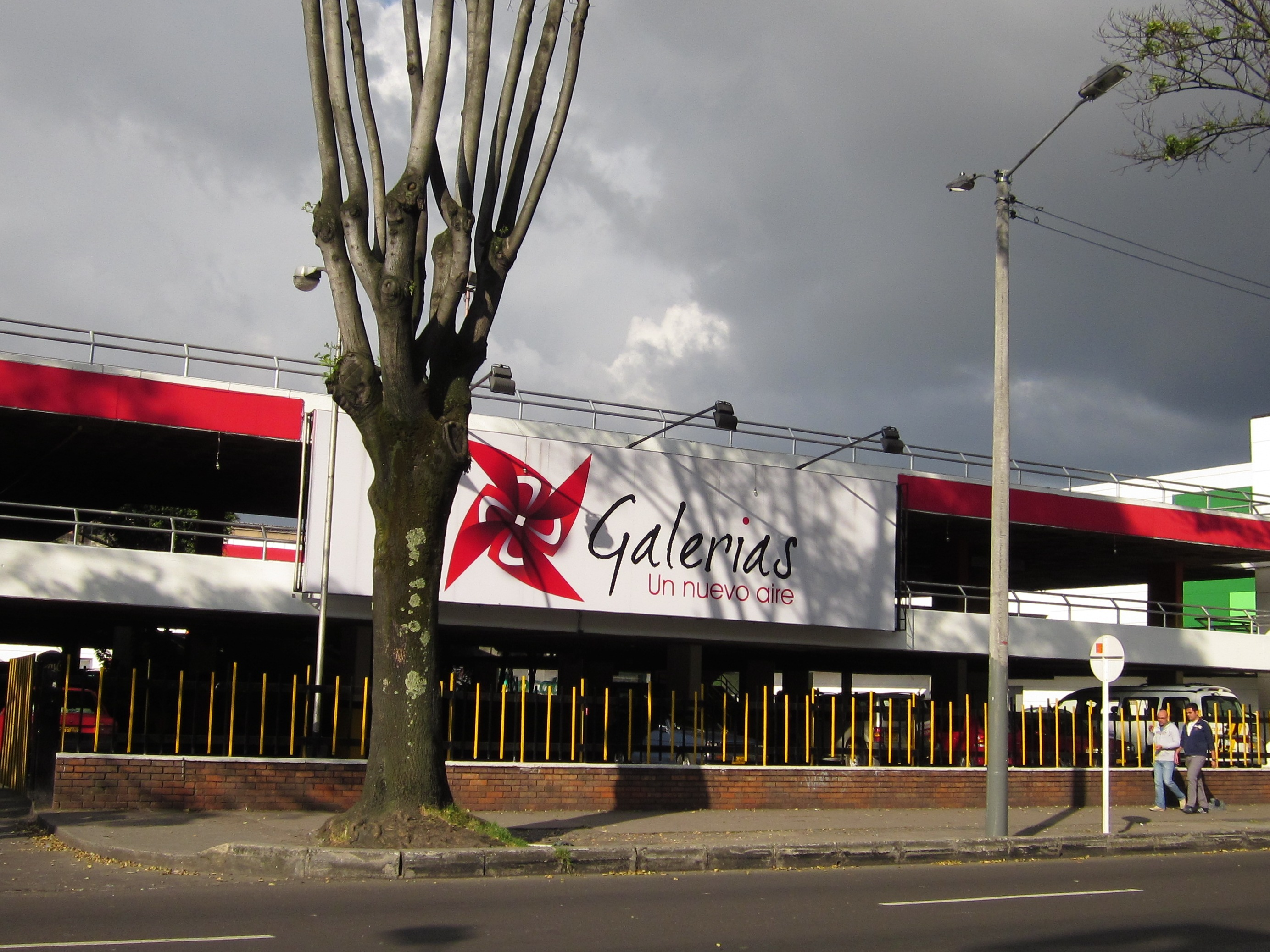
Galerías mall

The most important neighbourhoods in the locality are: Teusaquillo, La Magdalena, La Soledad, Cundinamarca, Palermo, Marly, Galerías, El Campín, Nuevo Campín, Quesada, Belalcázar, Nicolás de Federman, Rafael Nuñez, Ciudad Universitaria, Acevedo Tejada, Quinta Paredes, Centro Antonio Nariño, La Esmeralda, Pablo VI, Quirinal, San Luis, Simón Bolívar, Ortezal, Camavieja, Ciudad Salitre Oriental y CAN (Centro Administrativo Nacional).

The city government splits the locality into six Zonal Planning Units (Unidades de Planeación Zonal or UPZ). They are as follows, with year 2000 populations:

- La Esmeralda, 35,856
- Galerías, 33,685
- Teusaquillo, 29,162
- Quinta Paredes, 24,316
- Ciudad Salitre Oriental, 23,330
- Parque Central Simón Bolívar, 2,840

UPZ Parque Central is one of three UPZ in which Simón Bolívar is contained. UPZ Parque El Salitre is the portion of the park that lies in the Barrios Unidos locality, and UPZ Jardín Botánico is in Engativá locality.

The neighbourhood known as Ciudad Salitre is also made up of three UPZ, with only UPZ Ciudad Salitre Oriental located within Teusaquillo. The western part of this neighbourhood is officially part of the Fontibón locality.

== Notable people from Teusaquillo ==
- Salsa group La-33
