= Duit language =

Extinct Chibcha language of Colombia

Duit
- Native to: Boyacá, Colombia
- Region: Altiplano Cundiboyacense
- Ethnicity: Muisca
- Extinct: (date missing)
- Language family: Chibcha: Kuna-Colombian; Muisca–Duit; Duit
- Writing system: Only numerals

Language codes
- ISO 639-3: None (mis)
- Glottolog: duit1239
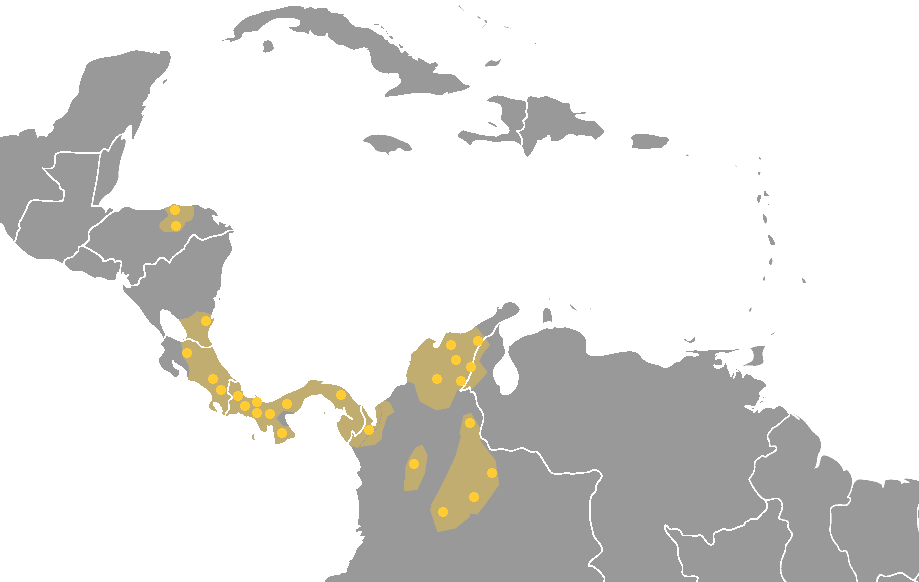
- The second-most southern yellow dot indicates roughly the area where Duit was spoken

Duit is an extinct Chibcha language formerly spoken by the Muisca of present-day Boyacá, Colombia. The language appears in the modern name of the pre-Columbian settlement and last ruler Tundama; Duitama.

== Description ==
The language is only known from one fragment analysed by scholar Ezequiel Uricoechea in 1871. The linguist mentioned that the analysed text was part of a larger work that hitherto has not been found. From the short text it was clear that the Duit language differed slightly from the main version of Chibcha, Muysccubun, spoken by the Muisca on the Altiplano Cundiboyacense.

As the Muisca did not have a script, only for their numerals, written Duit language texts do not exist.

== Comparison to Muisca and numerals ==
English	Duit	Muisca	Numerals as noted by Acosta, Humboldt and Zerda
one	atia	ata	
two	bocha	bosa	
three	meia	mica	
Sun	sa	súa	
Moon	tia	chía	
star	cúrcha	fagua	
Territory	coga	quyca	

== See also ==
- Comparison of Muysccubun with other Chibchan languages

== Bibliography ==
- Izquierdo Peña, Manuel Arturo (2009), The Muisca Calendar: An approximation to the timekeeping system of the ancient native people of the northeastern Andes of Colombia (PhD), Université de Montréal, pp. 1–170, arXiv:0812.0574
