= Muisca mummification =

The Muisca inhabited the Altiplano Cundiboyacense in the Colombian Andes before the arrival of the Spanish and were an advanced civilisation. They mummified the higher social class members of their society, mainly the zipas, zaques, caciques, priests and their families. The mummies would be placed in caves or in dedicated houses ("mausoleums") and were not buried.

Many mummies from the Chibcha-speaking indigenous groups have been found to date, mainly from the Muisca, Lache and Guane. In 1602 the early Spanish colonisers found 150 mummies in a cave near Suesca, that were organised in a scenic circular shape with the mummy of the cacique in the centre of the scene. The mummies were surrounded by cloths and pots. In 2007 the mummy of a baby was discovered in a cave near Gámeza, Boyacá, together with a small bowl, a pacifier and cotton cloths. The process of mummification continued into the colonial period. The youngest mummies have been dated to the second half of the 18th century.

The early Spanish chroniclers Gonzalo Jiménez de Quesada, Pedro Simón, Pedro de Aguado, Gonzalo Fernández de Oviedo y Valdés and others have provided the first historical data on the Muisca mummies. Modern researchers who contributed to the knowledge of the Muisca mummies have been 19th century scholars Ezequiel Uricoechea and Liborio Zerda. In the 20th and 21st century Eliécer Silva Celis and Abel Fernando Martínez Martín have been analysing various Muisca mummies.

== Background ==
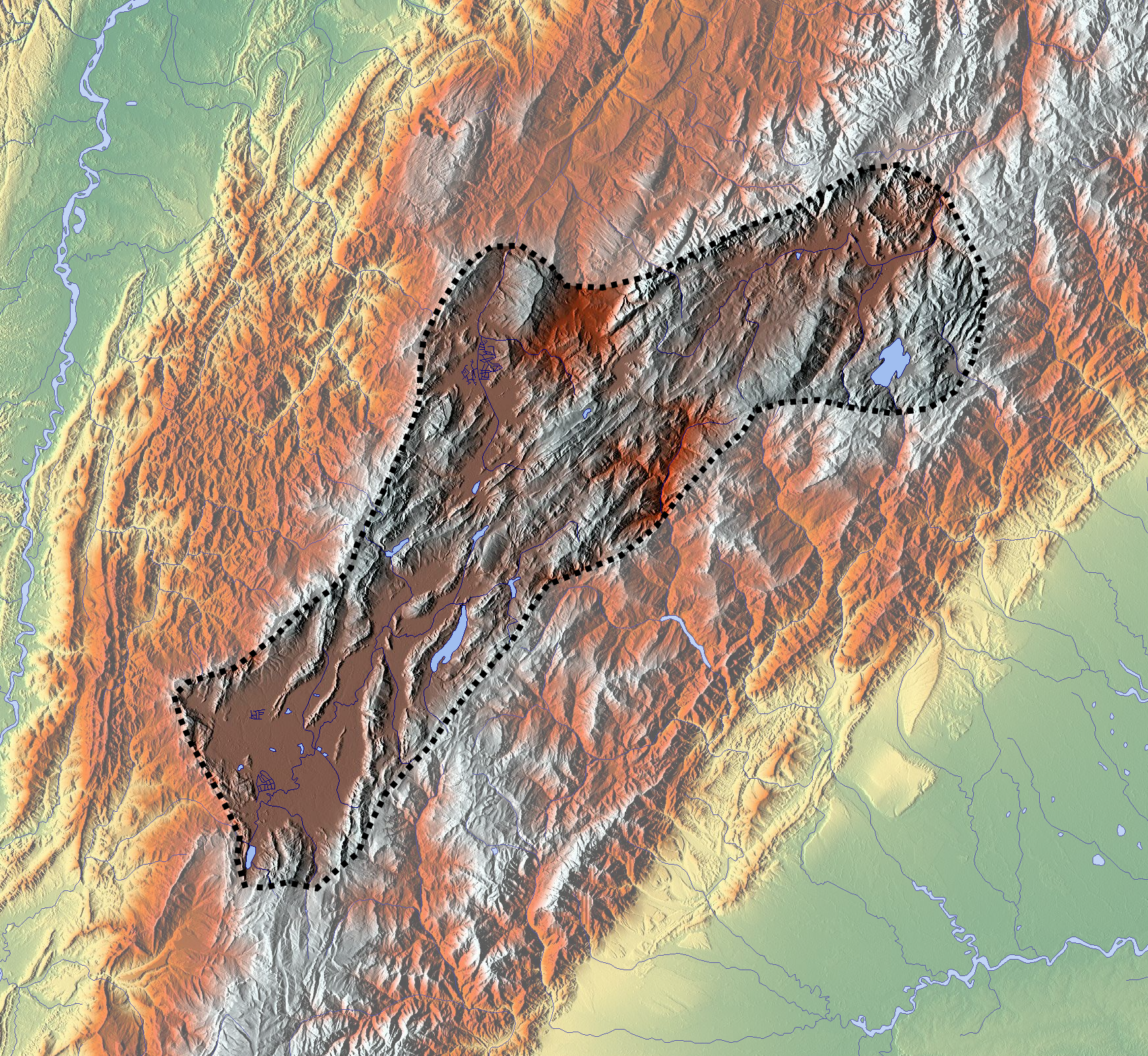
The Muisca inhabited the Altiplano Cundiboyacense in the Eastern Ranges of the Colombian Andes.

In the centuries before the Spanish conquest of the Muisca in 1537, the Altiplano Cundiboyacense, high plateau of the Eastern Ranges of the Colombian Andes, was inhabited by the Muisca people. They were an advanced civilisation of mainly farmers and traders.

The Muisca did not construct stone architecture, as the Maya, Aztec and Inca did; their houses, temples and shrines were built with wood and clay. They were called "Salt People" because of their extraction of halite from various salt mines on the Altiplano, predominantly in Zipaquirá, Nemocón and Tausa.

== Description ==
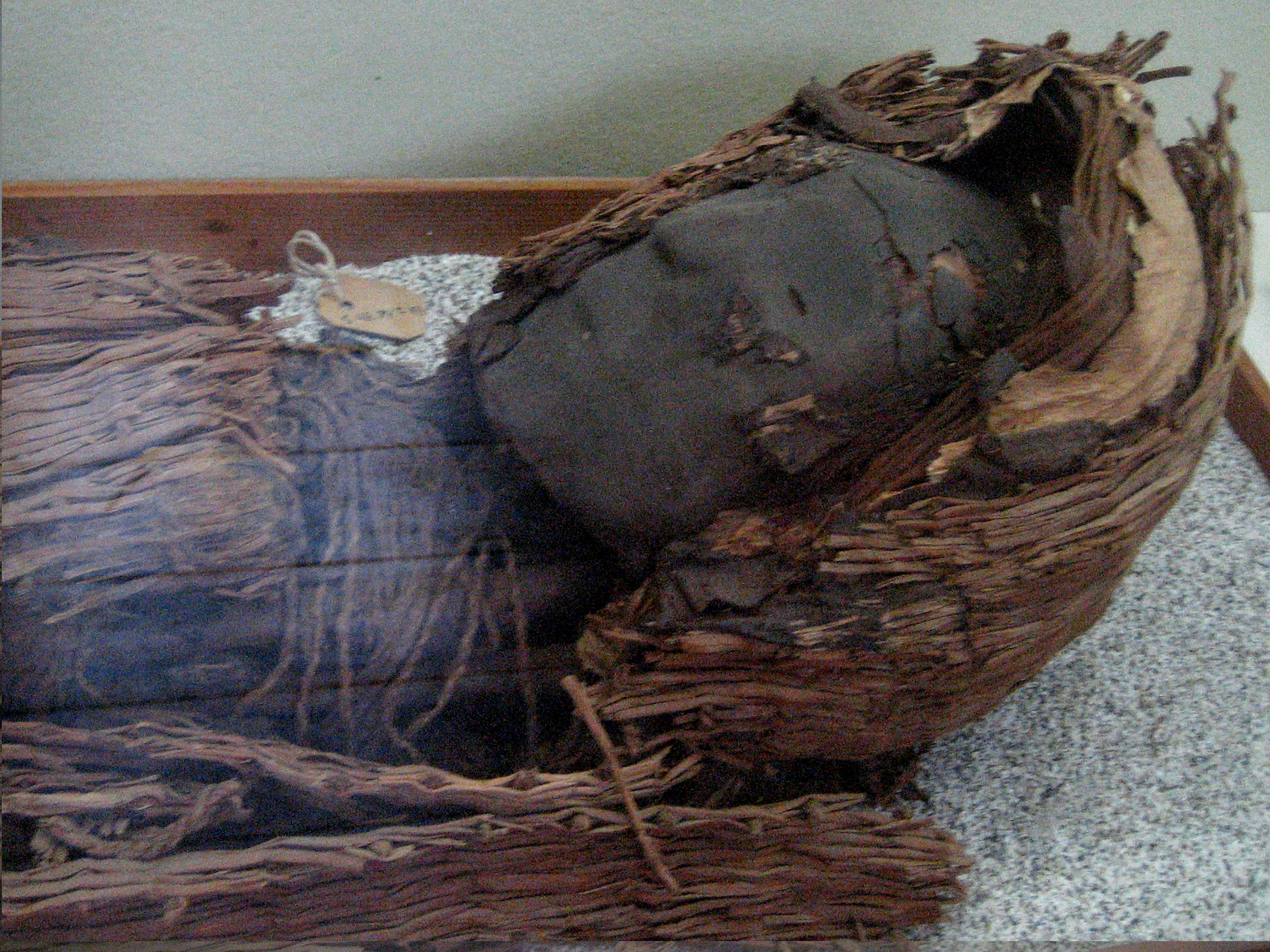
The oldest mummies of South America come from the northern Chilean Chinchorro culture.

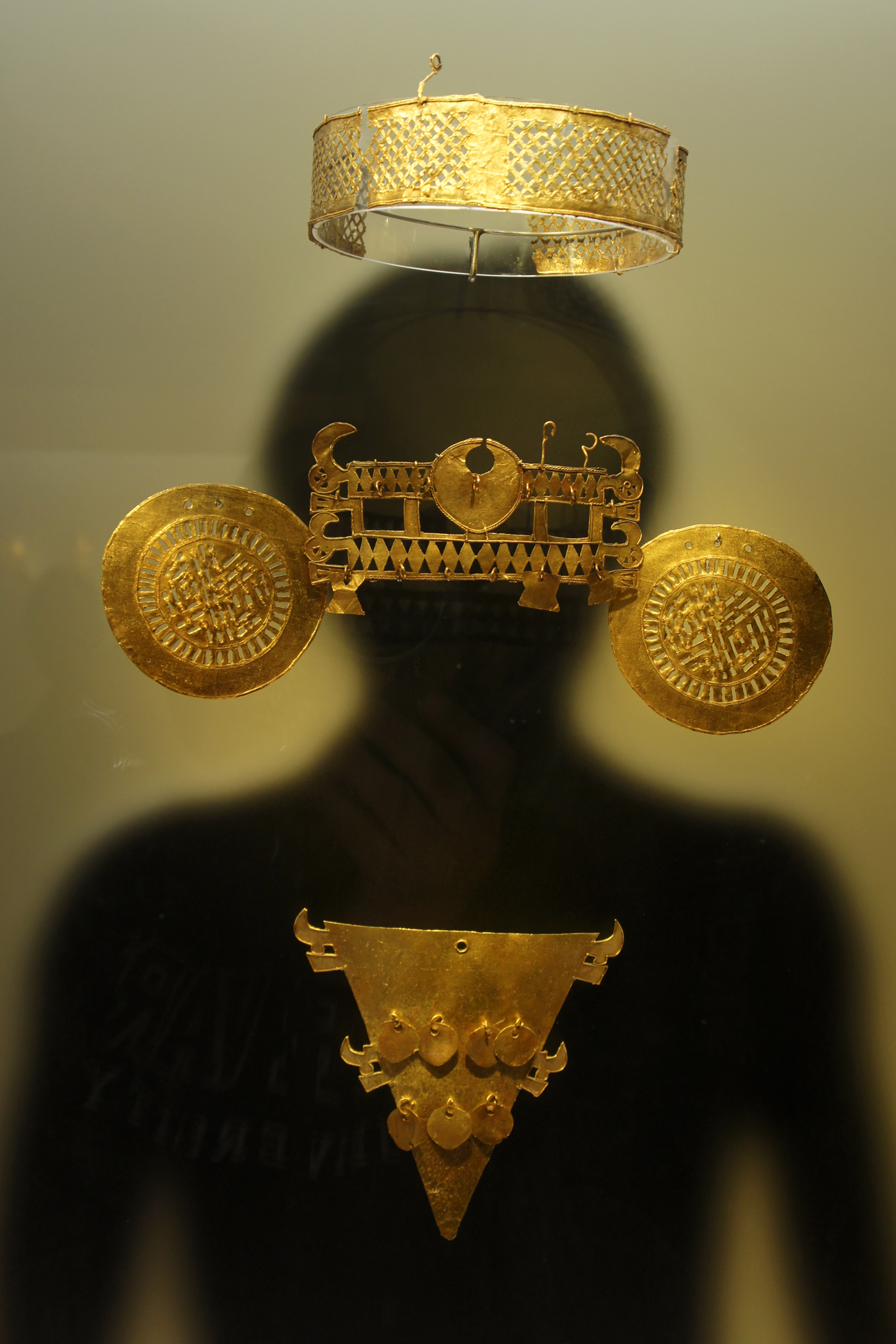
The mummies of the higher classes were decorated with golden crowns, earrings and noserings.

Mummification was a common practice in South American cultures. The Nazca, Paracas and Chachapoya of Peru conducted mummifications. The oldest evidence of mummification in the Americas is known from the Chinchorro culture in the Atacama Desert of northern Chile and has been dated at 7000 years BP. The practice was also performed by various pre-Columbian cultures in Colombia. Of the cultures to the southwest of the Altiplano, the Calima, Pijao and Quimbaya practiced mummification. On and close to the Altiplano the Muisca, Guane and Lache mummified their dead and north of the Altiplano the Chitarero and Zenú also executed the mummification process. The indigenous groups inhabiting the jungles of the Darién mummified their caciques.

The Muisca started their mummification practices in the Late Herrera Period, approximately from the 5th century AD onwards.

The use of substances to balm the body and the extraction of the organs has been described by franciscan Estebán de Asencio in 1550. The process took eight hours to dry the body with a dusty balm after the intestines were extracted. While the exact composition of the balm has not been determined, the moque was probably a type of resin, used in other rituals and practices around the mummification.

Another method of preparation of the mummies was more frequent. The body would be dried using fire and smoke and no extraction of organs would be performed. The heat of the fire not only dried the body, also the phenol liberated by the smoke would conserve the body and prevent it from decomposing. This process, that also the Guane performed to prepare their mummies, has been described by Pedro Simón.

The dried bodies were wrapped in various layers of cotton cloths, mostly painted. Emeralds were put in the mouths and to cover the eyes and bellybutton of the deceased and sometimes even cloths were inserted in their rectum. The ears and nose were covered with cotton cloths as well.

During the mummification rituals, the Muisca sang songs and drank chicha for various days in a row.

As the Muisca believed in an afterlife, the mummies were buried surrounded by pots with food as beans, maize and chicha, mantles and golden figures for their stay in another world, similar to ours. The mummies of the higher classes were decorated with golden earrings or noserings and with golden feathered crowns and emeralds.

The discovery of a cave in Gámeza, Boyacá in 2007, proved also children were mummified; a mummified baby of a couple of months old was wrapped in cotton cloths and accompanied by a teether, a small bowl, three strings of cotton and a small bag around the neck.

In the temples and places reserved for the mummies, the bodies were put on a platform of reed, as an elevated bed, called barbacoas. Other mummies were placed on small wooden stools. The mummies were left there without being buried. All the mummies found were in a similar sitting position with the arms and legs folded towards the torso. Ezequiel Uricoechea described in 1854 that the fingers of the mummified persons were strapped together with cotton cords. Some of the mummies, probably those of the warriors, were found with golden arms in their hands. The fighters were richly decorated with emeralds, crowns and fine cloths and bags of cotton.

According to Gonzalo Jiménez de Quesada who made the first contact with the Muisca, during the conquest, the guecha warriors carried mummies on their backs to serve as an example and to impress their enemies in their warfare. When his soldiers Miguel Sánchez and Juan Rodríguez Parra raided the Sun Temple in Sogamoso in September 1537, they found mummies decorated with golden crowns and other objects sitting on raised platforms.

=== Social classes ===
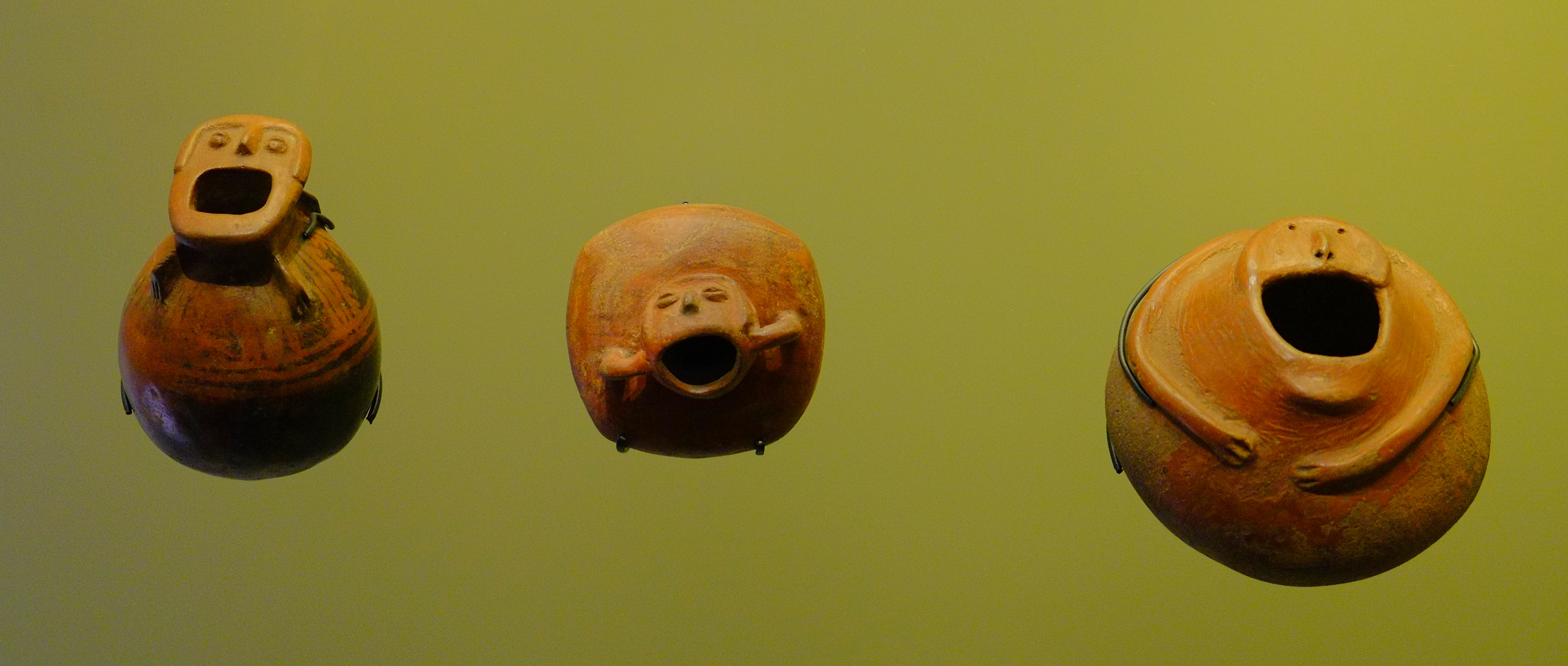
Small ceramic pots filled with food accompanied the mummies in their journey to the afterlife

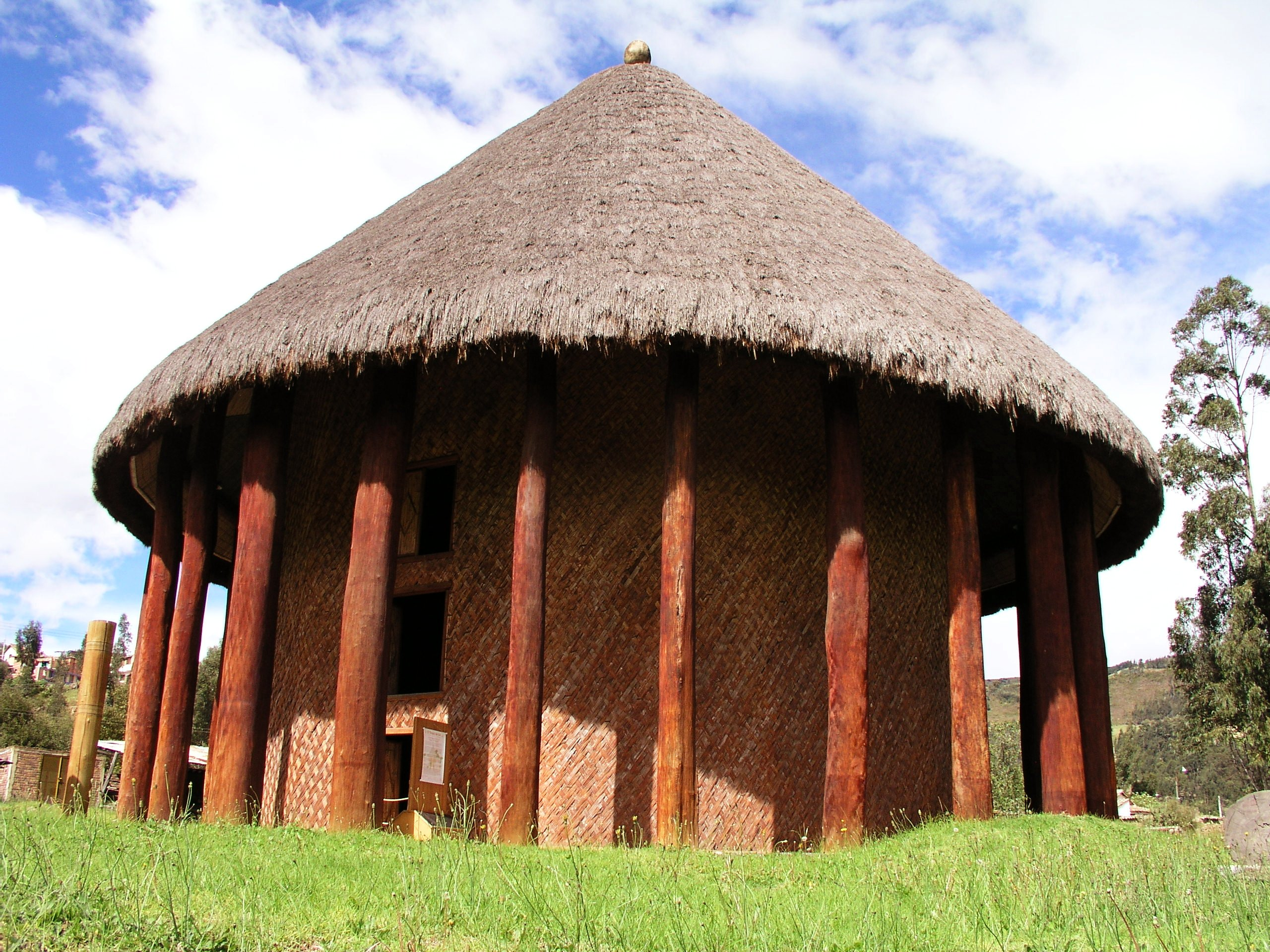
When the Spanish entered the sacred Sun Temple of Sogamoso in September 1537, they found mummies sitting on elevated platforms inside.

Although the Muisca society was generally egalitarian, differences in the burial processes indicate the distinction of the social classes. The higher class people and their families were mummified while lower classes were not. The zipa and zaque mummy sites, often in temples and caves, were decorated with golden stools and guarded by the priests. The caciques were put together with their slaves and wives and the priests (xeques) were placed in secret sites. Often the mummies of the caciques were kept in their own houses and the religious people consulted their ancestors in their prayers to them. In some cases special bohíos were constructed to house the mummies of the highest classes, as mausoleums.

=== Mummy SO10-IX ===
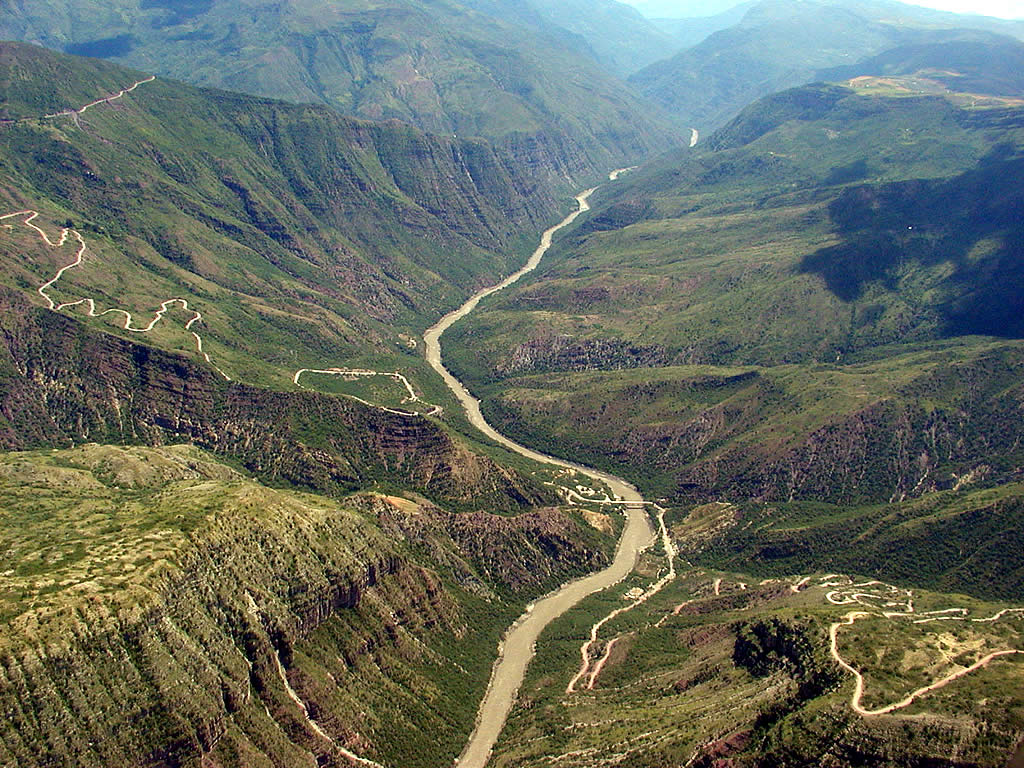
Mummy SO10-IX has been analysed in great detail and found on the right bank of the Chicamocha River in the north of the Muisca territory bordering the Guane terrains, as here in the Chicamocha Canyon.

The mummy from Sativanorte, named SO10-IX and belonging to the collection of Silva Celis in the Archaeology Museum of Sogamoso, has been studied in detail by various researchers. The mummy has been donated to the archaeologist by Abraham López Ávila in 1962. Interviews with López Ávila revealed that the mummy had been found by children in the vicinity of Sativanorte, Sativasur and Socotá on the western bank of the Chicamocha River.

The mummy has been carbon dated by researchers at the University of Uppsala at 615 +/- 35 years before 1950; between 1300 and 1370 AD.

The first analysis of the mummy SO10-IX has been performed in 2004, by a group of researcher of the UPTC in Tunja. The mummy was unwrapped in flexion, simulating the fetal position, missing the upper left limb, with partial loss of the right lower limb, conserving the leg and foot. Loss of skin and soft tissue to the bone at the pelvis and the abdominal region have been noted. The upper limbs were flexed, the hands interlaced and tied with a cotton cord; they were placed on the right side of the head. Three fragments of cotton blankets accompanied the mummy. The body showed evidence of perforations caused by cadaveric fauna.

Remains of Coleoptera (Ancognatha and Phyllophaga) were identified and remains of the left lung have been described in the thoracic cavity. The cranium was undeformed and showed remains of straight black hair with signs it had been cut. Cotton was found inside the ear and nostrils. One of the vertebrates showed an abscess. The mummy has been identified as probably a male of an established age of 30 +/- 5 years old. The length of the individual has been estimated at 166 centimetres (5.45 ft). The teeth of SO10-IX did not have cavities and in the mouth remains of algae and diatoms have been discovered.

Analysis of the mummy provided that it probably had been a shaman, based on the perforated ears, and that he suffered from illnesses in his limbs, cared for by the Muisca community.

=== Other Colombian Andean mummies ===
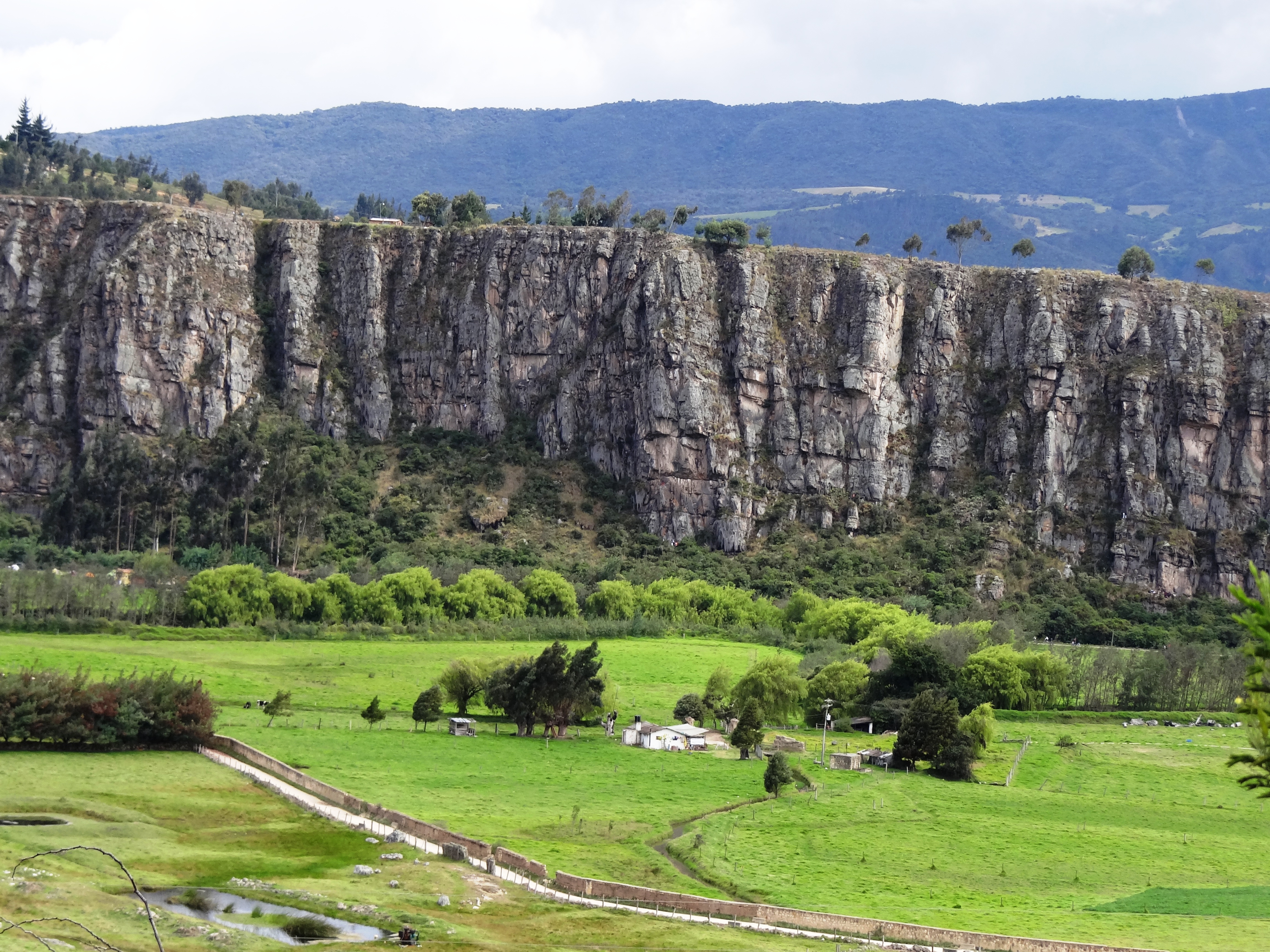
The early Spanish colonisers discovered in 1602 a cave in Suesca with 150 mummies organised in a circular fashion.

Muisca mummies have been discovered in Gachantivá, Iguaque, Villa de Leyva, Moniquirá, Socotá, Sogamoso, Tunja, Ubaté, Pisba, Usme and Suesca and mummies wrapped in cloths in Boavita, Tasco, Tópaga, Gámeza and Gachancipá. The mummies of Usme, discovered in 2007, revealed an extensive burial site of 30 hectares (74 acres). Oval and circular graves have been found, together with urns and some of the findings showed evidence of sacrifices. The 135 human remains have been dated to the 8th or 9th century until the 16th century AD. Evidence for alive burials were numerous and it is estimated it would take twenty years to fully analyse the site.

Mummies by surrounding groups were found in Chiscas, Sierra Nevada del Cocuy (Lache), Muzo (Muzo people), Bucaramanga, La Belleza and Los Santos (Guane), Silos (Chitarero) and Ocaña (Mosquito culture).

Until 2012, seventy mummies have been analysed in Colombia, of which 54 of the Chibcha-speaking people. The remaining 16 mummies have been found in the Serranía del Perijá and belonged to the Yuko culture. The majority of mummies discovered after the conquest were found in caves and represented scenes; they were organised in circles. In the Muisca history caves, together with lakes, waterfalls and rivers, have been important. In 1602, 150 mummies were discovered in a cave in Suesca, and were organised in a circle around the mummy of the cacique. The scene was completed with many small cotton cloths. The circular organisation around the cacique resembled the organisation of the Muisca villages, where the central bohío belonged to the ruler of the settlement.

In 1885 Muisca scholar Liborio Zerda described a mummy of a young girl, found in a cave on the Toquilla paramo, at 4,000 metres (13,000 ft) altitude within the municipality of Aquitania. The mummy was wrapped in cotton mantles and decorated with golden objects. The body was eternalised in a squatting position.

Some of the Muisca mummies found were so well conserved, that their facial expression did not look like the people died hundreds of years ago.

The Zenú and Panche oriented their mummies with the head to the east, while the Muzo buried their dead with the head to the west. The Muisca commonly directed the heads of the deceased to the east, although other graves have been found oriented to the south.

== Museum collections ==
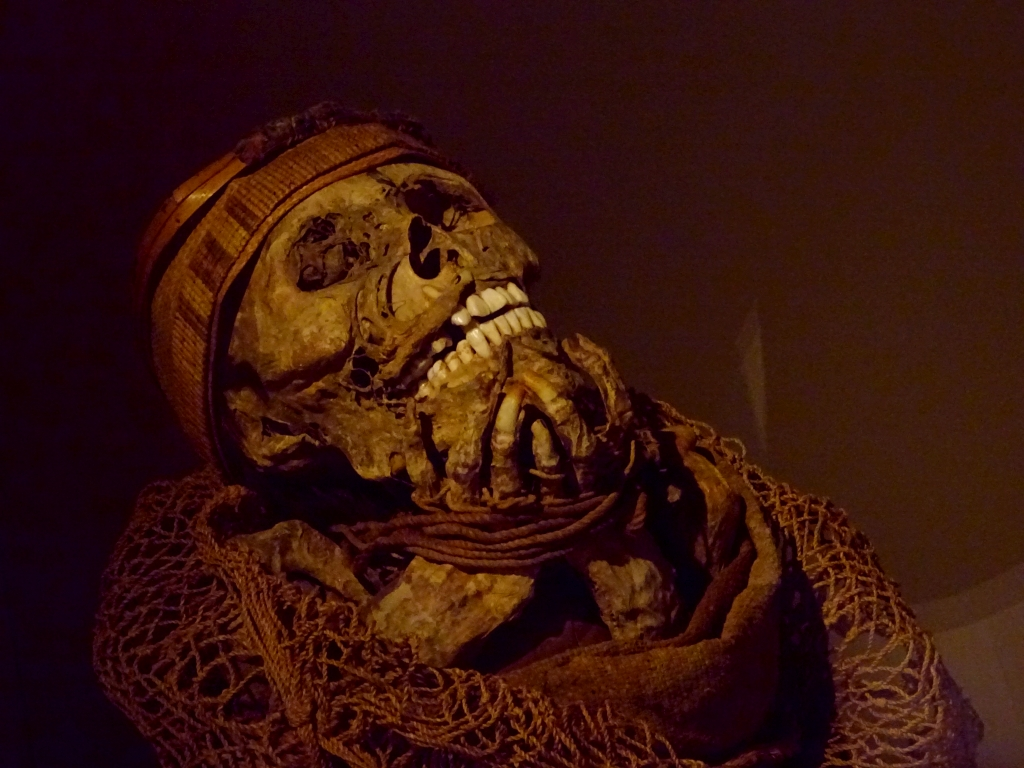
Muisca mummy in the Gold Museum, Bogotá

Muisca mummies are on display or in the collections of museums in Colombia. The Museo del Oro (mummy from Pisba, Boyacá), the Museo Arqueológico Casa del Marqués de San Jorge and the Museo Nacional in Bogotá have Muisca mummies on display and the mummies from Sativasur and Gámeza are kept in the Archaeology Museum in Sogamoso. The mummy found in Gachantivá is part of the collection of the British Museum in London.

== See also ==
- Muisca art
- Inca mummy Juanita
- Aztec, Chinchorro mummification
- Muisca religion
