= Liborio Zerda =

Colombian anthropologist (1833–1919)

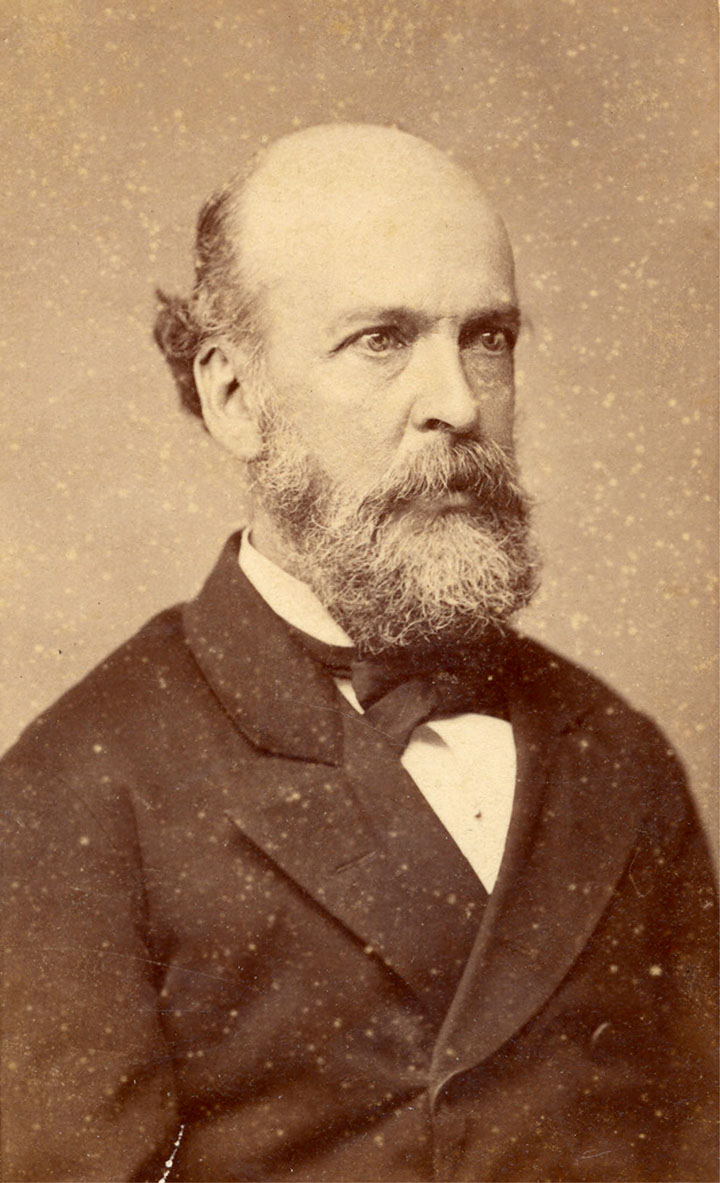
- Born: 10 July 1834; Bogotá, Republic of New Granada
- Died: 9 November 1919 (aged 85); Bogotá, Colombia
- Education: Medicine
- Alma mater: Universidad Central
- Known for: El Dorado, numerals, chicha
- Scientific career
- Fields: Medicine, history
- Workplaces: Colegio del Rosario (1858–1918)

At the end of the 19th century, radioactivity was discovered. In these years Zerda published about the phenomenon and about ions and electrons

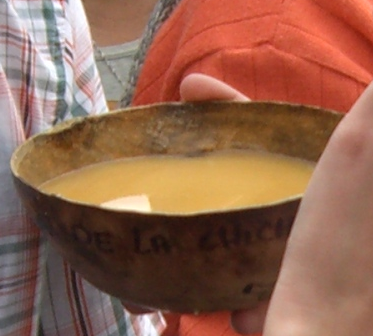
In 1889 Liborio Zerda published about chicha, alcoholic beverage of maize and sugar, produced by the Muisca and still popular in 19th century Bogotá

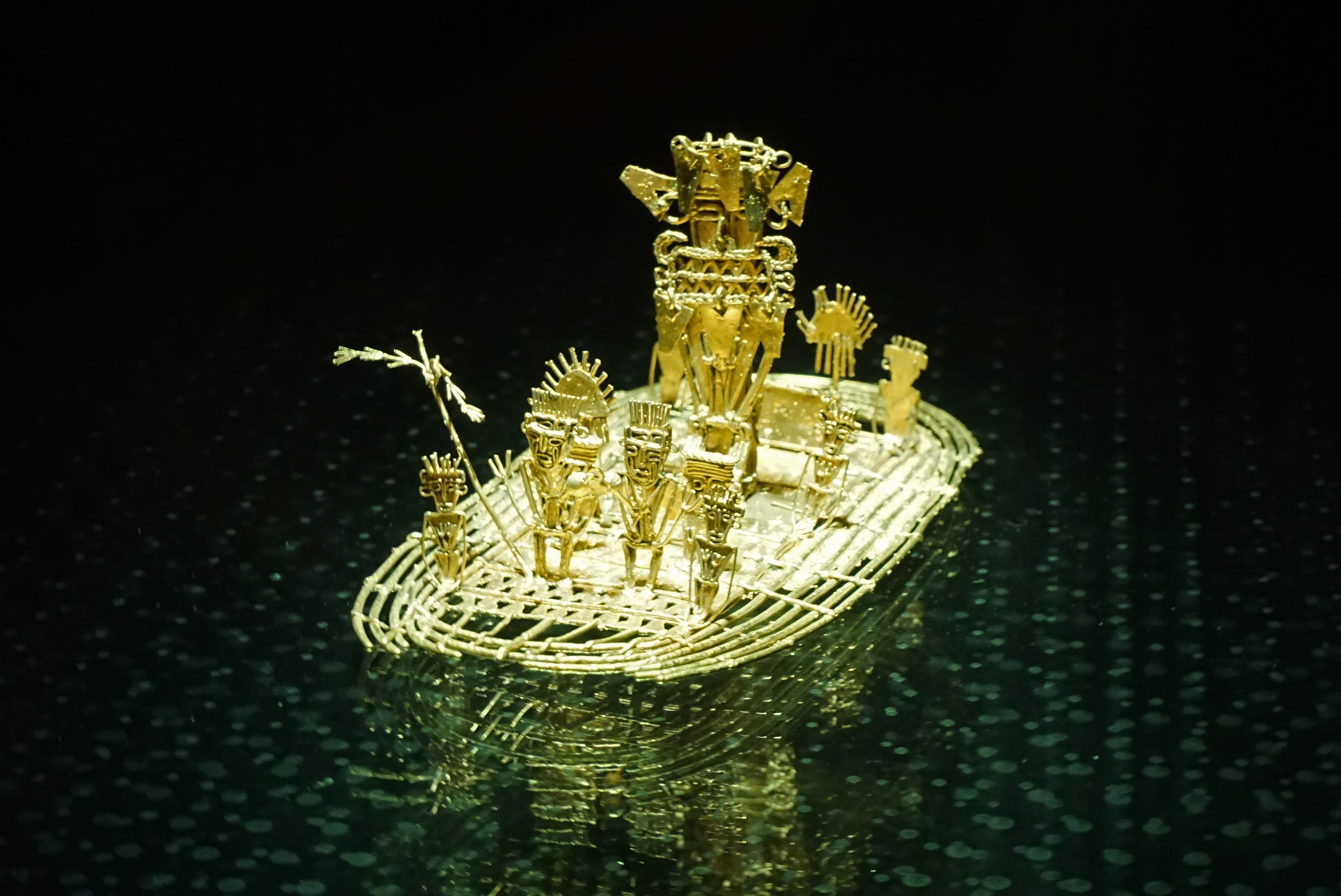
Zerda's most renowned work El Dorado (1883) tells about the ritual at Lake Guatavita, represented in the golden Muisca raft, which was not found until after Zerda's death

Muisca numerals were studied by Zerda

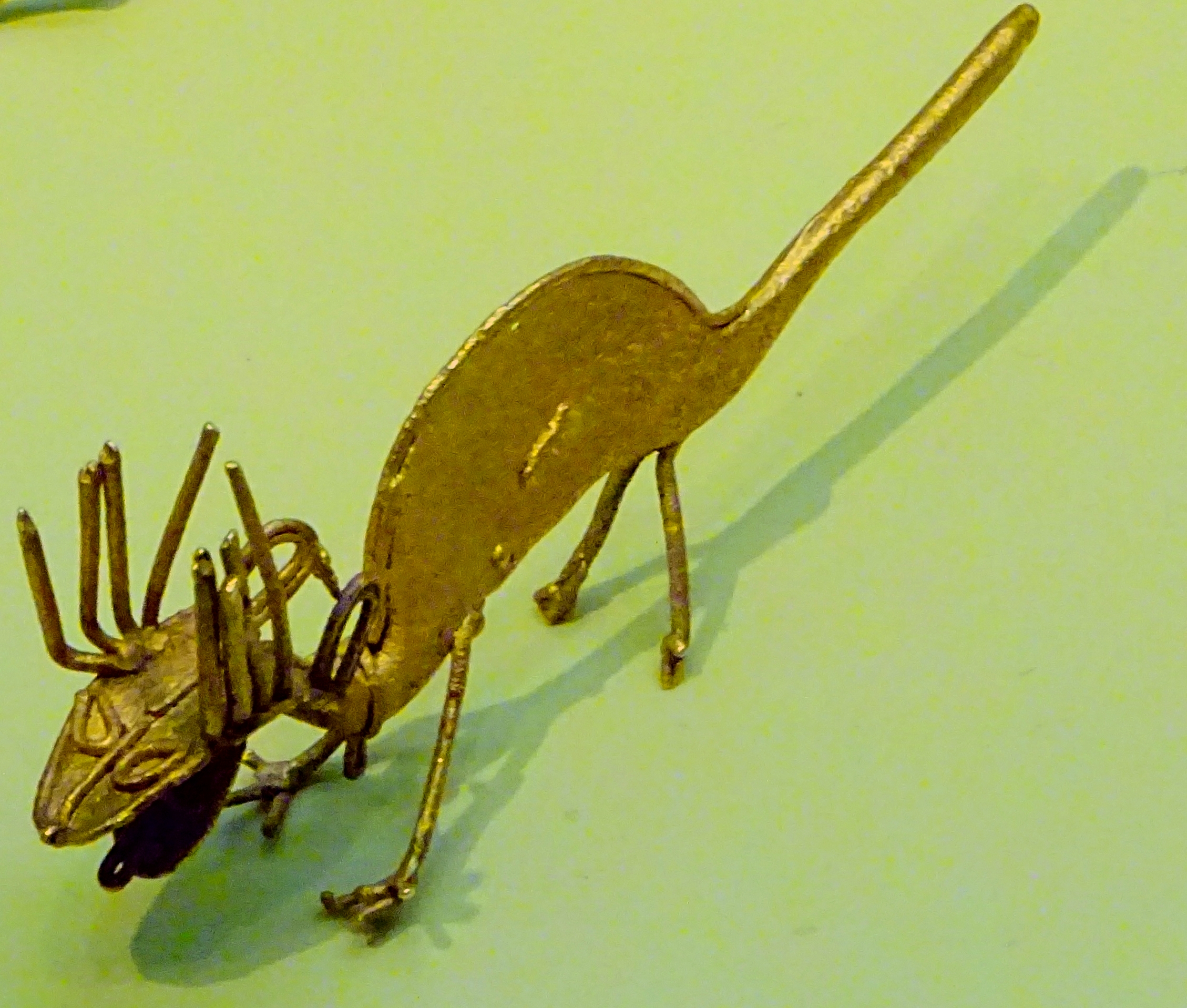
A mould for the production of tunjos may have been misinterpreted by Zerda to be a Muisca calendar

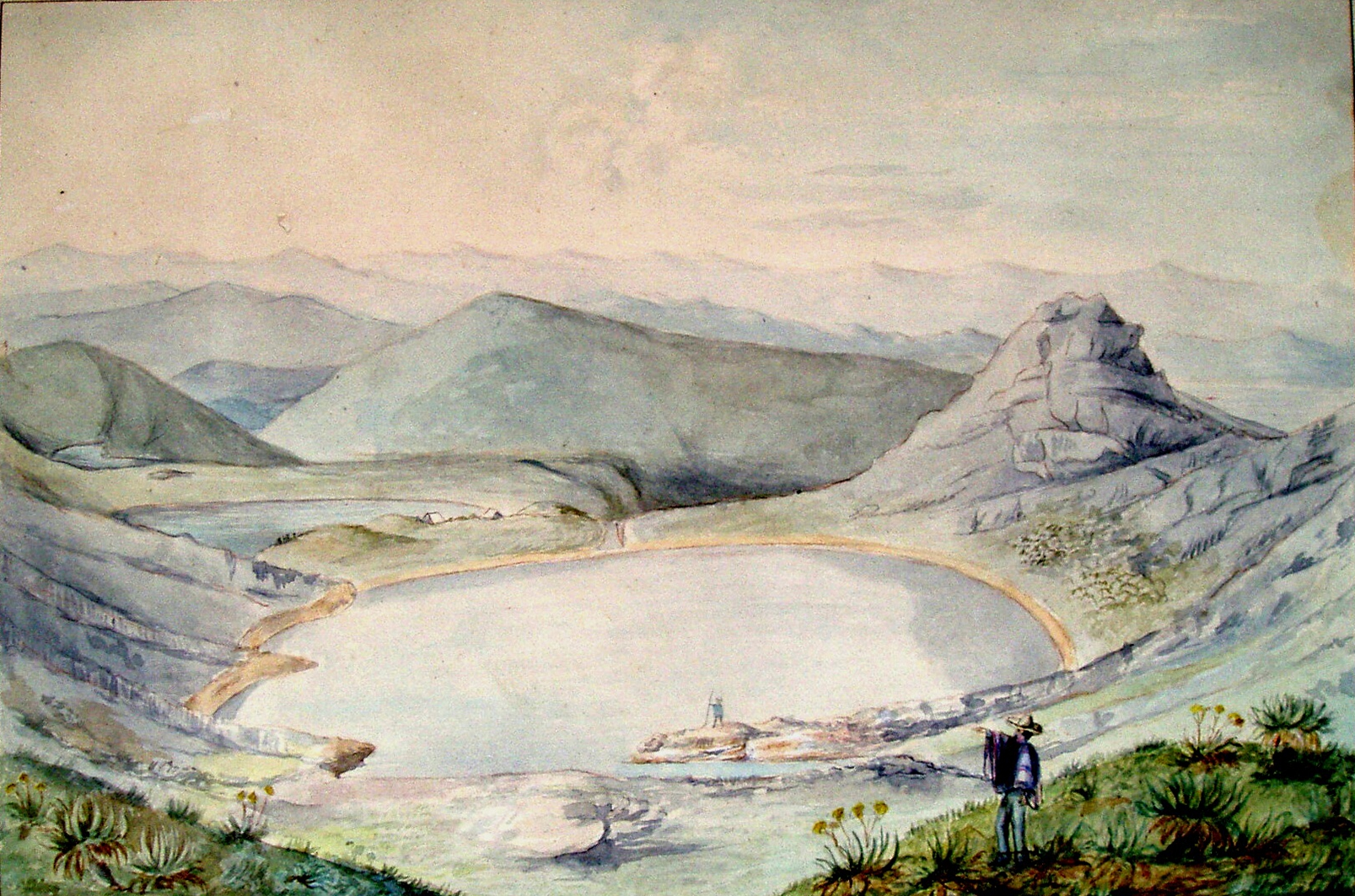
Zerda believed the site of the El Dorado ritual was not Lake Guatavita, as is commonly accepted today, yet in the Siecha Lakes

Liborio Zerda (Bogotá, Republic of New Granada, 10 July 1834 (other sources state 1830 or 1833) - Bogotá, Colombia, 9 November 1919) was a Colombian physician and Muisca scholar. Zerda has been important in the natural sciences of the late 19th and early 20th century in Colombia, publishing many articles about various topics, from medicine to chemical analysis, radioactivity and the popular drink chicha.

Zerda was contemporaneous with other Muisca scholars, and influenced by them; Joaquín Acosta and Ezequiel Uricoechea. He analysed the work done by José Domingo Duquesne on the Muisca numerals and published in 1883 his major work El Dorado about the mythical El Dorado, that he situated not in Lake Guatavita as is currently accepted to have been the site of the inauguration of the new zipa, but in the Siecha Lakes in the Chingaza Natural National Park.

Liborio Zerda taught at the Colegio del Rosario in Bogotá for 60 years and died on 9 November 1919 in the Colombian capital.

== Biography ==
Liborio Zerda was born on 10 July 1830, 1833 or 1834 in the capital of the then Republic of New Granada, Bogotá. He attended the Colegio de San Bartolomé, a strict school that prohibited their students to walk on the streets at night, enter houses with a bad reputation, playing games or read obscene books. His interest for natural sciences was born at the Colegio Mayor de Nuestra Señora del Rosario, where Zerda, as student of Joaquín Acosta, took classes in chemistry, geology and mineralogy. Liborio Zerda studied medicine at the Universidad Central in the capital, graduating in 1853. He became a medical practitioner in Bogotá right after finishing his studies and in 1854 gained his specialisation in surgery and military medicine.

After the foundation of the Comisión Corográfica in 1850, led by Italian Agustín Codazzi, Zerda founded the Sociedad Caldas in 1855. In 1859 Zerda joined the Sociedad de Naturalistas Neogranadinos, which was founded by Muisca scholar Ezequiel Uricoechea. In this society, Liborio Zerda analysed mineralogy, while teaching courses on chemistry and physics. In those times, the studies of natural sciences were not yet well developed in Colombia. Zerda published about the "new" phenomenon of radioactivity.

In 1865 Zerda founded the Escuela de Medicina Privada, precursor of present-day private medicine schools. During the first years of this school, Zerda published about coca and opium use in Bogotá (Estudios sobre la Coca y el Opio bogotano), drinking water analysis (Análisis de las aguas potables de Bogotá) and oils (Método para blanquear y purificar los aceites grasos). A year later, he published his first book, about horse medicine; Hipiátrica, tratado de medicina del caballo.

1867 was the year of foundation of the Universidad Nacional, that housed a faculty on natural sciences (Escuela de Ciencias Naturales). Zerda published about the chemical analysis, mainly of salt, common on the Altiplano Cundiboyacense, with works titled Análisis de sal gema, sal compactada, sal cristalizada y de agua de las principales fuentes salinas de la República, Determinación de la presencia del iodo en el pescado del río Funza, Análisis químico y estudio de las aplicaciones medicinales de varias aguas minerales naturales and Análisis sobre muestras de hulla de la Sabana de Bogotá, Zipaquirá y Riohacha. For this publication, Zerda was awarded the Medalla de Oro en la Exposición Nacional. In 1891 Zerda wrote the Catálogo de la colección mineralógica and published about snake venom.

During the later 19th century, Zerda published about chicha, the alcoholic beverage of the Muisca that was popular at the time, with a publication called Estudio químico patológico e higiénico de la chicha, bebida popular en Colombia. He also wrote about ions, electrons and radium (El radium y sus propiedades maravillosas) and the illnesses flies spread (Las moscas transmisoras de enfermedad). His work on chicha revealed the danger of maize infected with a fungus.

Zerda died on 9 November 1919 in his city of birth Bogotá.

=== About the Muisca ===
The interests of the intellectual Zerda were not restricted to the natural sciences. He published papers about the history of the Muisca, their habits, traditions and religion. His book El Dorado, published in 1883 and reprinted in 1947, is one of the first anthropological, historical and ethnographical studies on the original inhabitants of the Bogotá savanna and northern areas of the Altiplano.

Liborio Zerda analysed the work by José Domingo Duquesne who in 1795 had written about the language and numerals of the Muisca. The Chibcha language was almost extinct by the late 19th century and the revival of it by Zerda has aided in later analyses of the language.

On the Muisca numerals, Zerda discovered the importance of frogs in the Muisca culture. He stated that the frog represented the times of draught on the Altiplano. An extended frog or one without legs symbolises rest, happiness and the harvests. Frogs with a human head stand for intelligence. An eagle with a frog in its claws symbolised summer. The frog was known from the Muisca calendar, that was first analysed by Duquesne. Zerda theorised that the well-known publication of Duquesne (Disertación sobre el origen del calendario y jeroglíficos de los moscas) was merely a summary of the larger work Anillo astronóomico de los moscas. Zerda did not analyse the work done on the Muisca calendar by famous naturalist Alexander von Humboldt, who met Duquesne in Colombia in the early 19th century. Liborio Zerda wrote about a stone that represented the calendar, a similar stone as the Choachí Stone, which was found later. It has been thought possible by researcher Manuel Arturo Izquierdo Peña that the stone Zerda described was actually a mould used in the famous goldworking of the Muisca, to produce tunjos.

In the later chapters of El Dorado, Zerda draws comparisons between the origins of the indigenous peoples of the Americas with Africa and Asia, based on metalworking and ceramics. In his work, he described the ritual of El Dorado in sacred Lake Guatavita, represented in the golden Muisca raft, which was found after Zerda's death in Pasca, Cundinamarca. The book also treats other indigenous tribes of Colombia, such as the Panche and others and formed the basis for the 20th century anthropological studies of the Muisca.

In the view of Zerda, the Muisca were a Neolithic culture and their ancient roads were built by an earlier, superior civilisation. Deeply influenced by the ethnological works of Lubbock, De Mortillet and Broca, Zerda proposed a long chronology of the history of the Muisca. He defended the period of Spanish conquest to educate the primitive Muisca to a higher level. Zerda proposed the sacred Siecha Lakes were the actual site of El Dorado, later found to have been Lake Guatavita.

Liborio Zerda's research revealed the diet of the Muisca people was formed by the deer species Cervus virginianus, Cervus mexicanus and Cervus simplicicomis, and fish from the Funza and other rivers (Eremophilus mutisii and Grundulus bogotensis). The fish provided a source of iodine for the Muisca.

In 1885, Zerda described a mummy of a young girl, found in a cave on the Toquilla paramo within the municipality of Aquitania, at 4,000 metres (13,000 ft) altitude. The mummy was decorated with golden objects and wrapped in cotton mantles. The body was organised in a squatting position.

He also wrote about Cuchavira, god of the rainbow of the Muisca.

== Works ==
This list is a selection.

=== Books ===
- 1883 - El Dorado; estudio histórico, etnográfico y arqueológico de los Chibchas, habitantes de la antigua Cundinamarca, y de algunas otras tribus
- 1880 - Monografía del caucho
- 1873 - Análisis industrial de diez y seis clases de ulla de los contornos de la sabana de Bogotà y una de Riohacha, practicado por Liborio Zerda
- 1866 - Hipiátrica, tratado de medicina del caballo

=== Articles ===
- 1910 - Reglamento para las escuelas normales
- 1906 - Fisica molecular
- 1906 - Hipotesis. Propuesta para explicar la radioactividad
- 1906 - Metodos para reconocer si una materia es radioactiva
- 1903 - Utilidad del estudio elemental de anatomia y fisiologia aplicables a las bellas artes
- 1893 - Acuerdo celebrado entre el gobierno y la consiliatura del Colegio Mayor de Nuestra Senora del Rosario
- 1892 - La balsa del dorado
- 1889 - Estudio quimico, patologico e higienico de la chica, [sic] bebida popular en Colombia
- 1889 - La ptomaina de la chicha
- 1881 - El eucalyptus
- 1881 - Construccion de un anfiteatro en el patio principal de San Juan de Dios
- 1871 - Programa de la clase de Metalurjia i esplotacion de minas
- 1868 - Escuela de ciencias naturales. Programa de física matemática i médica

== Trivia ==
- The Universidad del Rosario in Bogotá has named an investigation prize after Liborio Zerda

== See also ==
- List of Muisca scholars
- Muisca
- Muisca numerals
- Muisca raft, El Dorado

== Notable works by Zerda ==
- Zerda, Liborio (1947) [1883], El Dorado (PDF) (in Spanish)
- Zerda, Liborio (1880), Monografía del caucho (in Spanish)

== Bibliography ==
- Bohórquez Caldera, Luis Alfredo (2008), "Concepción sagrada de la naturaleza en la mítica muisca - Sacred definition of nature in the Muisca mythology", Franciscanum (in Spanish), L (149), Universidad de San Buenaventura: 151–176, ISSN 0120-1468
- Correal Urrego, Gonzalo (1990), Aguazuque: Evidence of hunter-gatherers and growers on the high plains of the Eastern Ranges (PDF) (in Spanish), Bogotá, Colombia: Banco de la República: Fundación de Investigaciones Arqueológicas Nacionales, pp. 1–316
- Guarín Martínez, Óscar (2005), "De bárbaros a civilizados: la invención de los muiscas en el siglo XIX - From brutals to civilised: the invention of the Muisca in the 19th century", Muiscas: representaciones, cartografías y etnopolíticas de la memoria (in Spanish), Universidad La Javeriana, pp. 228–246, ISBN 958-683-643-6
- Izquierdo Peña, Manuel Arturo (2009), The Muisca Calendar: An approximation to the timekeeping system of the ancient native people of the northeastern Andes of Colombia (PhD), Université de Montréal, pp. 1–170, arXiv:0812.0574
- Langebaek, Carl Henrik (2005), "La élite no siempre piensa lo mismo - The elite does not always think the same", Muiscas: representaciones, cartografías y etnopolíticas de la memoria (in Spanish), Universidad La Javeriana, pp. 180–199, ISBN 958-683-643-6
- Martínez Martín, A. F.; Manrique Corredor, E. J. (2014), "Alimentación prehispánica y transformaciones tras la conquista europea del altiplano cundiboyacense, Colombia" [Pre-Columbian Food and Transformations after European Conquest of Cundiboyacense High Plateau, Colombia], Revista Virtual Universidad Católica del Norte (in Spanish), 41, Universidad Católica del Norte: 96–111, ISSN 0124-5821
- Martínez Martín, Abel Fernando; Martínez Santamaría, Luz (2012), "Sobre la momificación y los cuerpos momificados de los muiscas - On mummification and the mummified bodies of the Muisca", Revista Salud Historia Sanidad, 7 (in Spanish), 1: 61–80, ISSN 1909-2407
- Villa Posse, Eugenia (1993), Mitos y leyendas de Colombia - Volumen III - Myths and legends of Colombia - Volume 3 (in Spanish), IADAP, pp. 1–160, ISBN 9978-60-004-3
