= Jesús Arango Cano =

Colombian diplomat, historian and writer (1915–2015)

dr. Jesús Arango Cano
- Born: 21 June 1915; La Tebaida, Quindío, Colombia
- Died: 9 January 2015 (aged 99); Armenia, Quindío, Colombia
- Known for: Archaeology, anthropology, folklore
- Spouse: Marina Montoya
- Scientific career
- Fields: Archaeology, anthropology

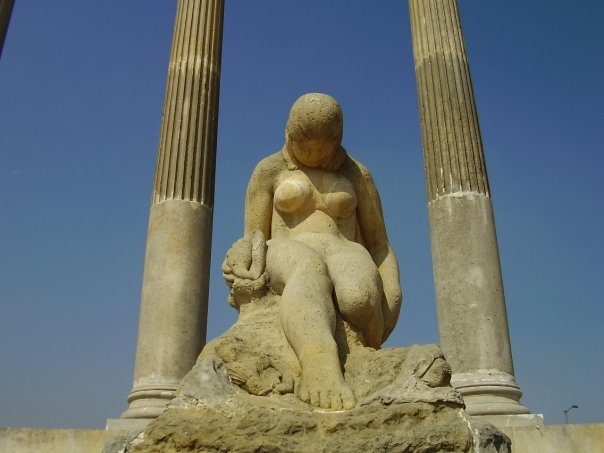
Bachué, mother goddess in the Muisca religion, described by Arango Cano

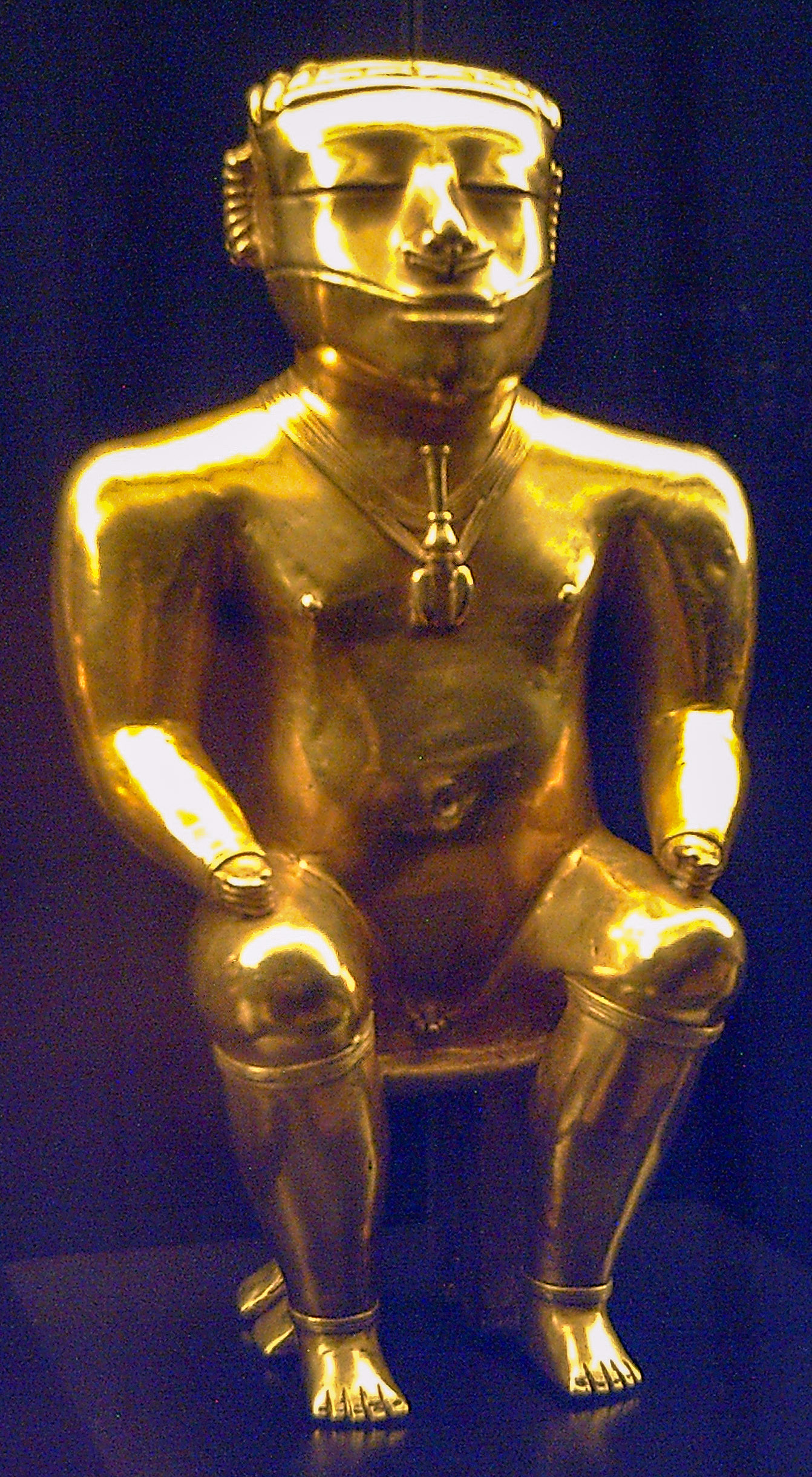
Quimbaya cacique, civilization from central Colombia where Jesús Arango Cano published about

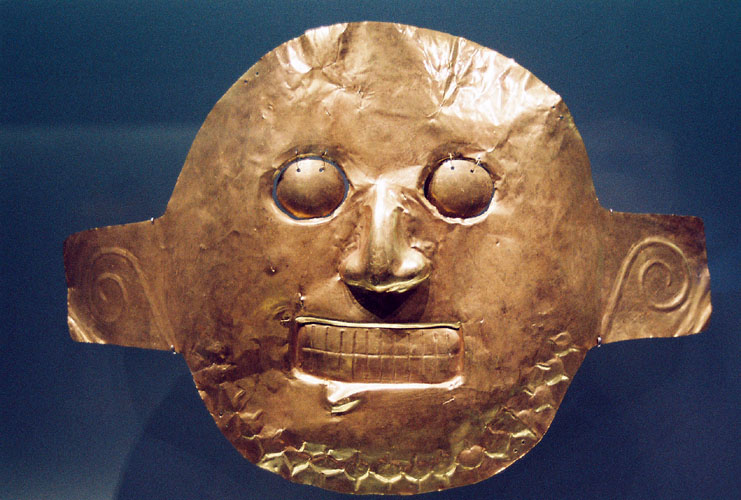
Arango Cano published about the Calima

Jesús Arango Cano (21 June 1915 – 9 January 2015) was a Colombian economist, diplomat, anthropologist, archaeologist and writer.

== Biography ==
Arango Cano was born in La Tebaida, Colombia, a village that his father, archaeologist Luis Arango Cardona, founded a year after his birth. He attended the Rutgers Preparatory School in New Brunswick, New Jersey and studied Economy at the University of California and later International Relations at Columbia University, New York.

In the 1940s Arango Cano became consul for Colombia in São Paulo, Brazil and Undersecretary of International Relations.

Arango Cano has written more than fifty books of which 40 are published. His first two books were Inmigración para Colombia, published in 1951, and Inmigración y Colonización en la Gran Colombia in 1953.

In 1965 Arango published his book Mitos, leyendas y dioses chibchas, about the myths, legends and deities of the Muisca. He also wrote about the Quimbaya, Calima and other indigenous groups, not only of Colombia, but also about the Aztec and Incas. Arango published about the Eje Cafetero, the coffee region in central Colombia where he was born.

In the 1970s, Arango Cano followed his father and became an archaeologist. In 1974 his work Las esmeraldas sagradas: el tesoro de Furatena about Furatena, mythological figure for the Muzo people was published.

On 23 May 1980, Arango Cano together with other historians founded the Academia de Historia del Quindío.

Jesús Arango Cano has published mainly in Spanish and also in English and German.

Arango Cano died in Armenia, Quindío, on 9 January 2015, at age 99.

== Works ==
This list is a selection.

=== Books ===
- 1951 – INMIGRANTES PARA COLOMBIA
- 1953 – Inmigración y colonización en la Grancolombia
- 1955 – Geografía física y económica de Colombia
- 1957 – La industria mundial del cafe
- 1959 – Estados Unidos, mito y realidad
- 1960 – VERDADES AMARGAS SOBRE LA DEMOCRACIA
- 1962 – Capitalismo, comunismo y libertad
- 1967 – GEOGRAFIA Y ECONOMICA DEL QUINDIO
- 1967 – REVALUACION DE LAS ANTIGUAS CULTURAS ABORIGENES DE COLOMBIA
- 1969 – Diálogos cafeteros
- 1970 – LA EUROPA QUE YO VI
- 1971 – Cuentos y anécdotas de mi tierra
- 1972 – LOS HEROES LLORAN EN LA OBSCURIDAD
- 1971 – ABORIGENES LEGENDARIOS Y DIOSES CHIBCHAS
- 1974 – Las esmeraldas sagradas: el tesoro de Furatena
- 1974 – EL IDIOMA ESPAÑOL EN COLOMBIA DESDE LA CONQUISTA HASTA HOY
- 1976 – Cerámica quimbaya y calima
- 1976 – MI GRAN AVENTURA COSMICA
- 1979 – PRECOLUMBIAN CERAMICS
- 1985 – Las dos caras de Estados Unidos
- 1987 – MITOS LEYENDAS Y DIOSES CHIBCHAS
- 1987 – MI MUNDO INTERIOR
- 1989 – Mitología en América precolombina : México-aztecas, Colombia-chibchas, Perú-incas
- 1989 – EMOCIONES DEL ALMA
- 1991 – Fantasías del corazón
- 1992 – LOS CAMINOS DEL ENSUEÑO
- 1994 – LA GRAN CULTURA QUIMBAYA
- 1994 – DICCIONARIO BACANO
- 1996 – Cuentos y relatos de la vida real
- 1996 – CAMINOS ILUMINADOS POEMAS
- 1997 – MIS REFLEXIONES
- 2000 – APUNTES PARA LA HISTORIA DEL QUINDIO
- 2001 – ENSAYO SOBRE EL IDIOMA ESPAÑOL Y EL LIBRO
- 2002– ORIGEN Y DESARROLLO DEL CAMINO DEL QUINDIO
- – HUSOS, SELLOS Y RODILLOS
- – ABORIGENES LEGENDARIOS DE COLOMBIA
- – CAPITALISMO CONSUMISMO Y LIBERTAD
- – DIALOGOS CAFETEROS

=== Articles ===
- 2000 – Y hablando de ortografía
- 1999 – En defensa de la gramática y a propósito de la "ch" y la "ll"
- 1997 – Cervantes, don Quijote y el amor
- 1979 – La dimensión espacial de la crisis en España

== See also ==
- List of Muisca scholars
- Muisca

== Notable works by Arango Cano ==
- Arango Cano, Jesús (2004) [1965], Mitos, leyendas y dioses chibchas – Muisca myths, legends and gods (in Spanish), Plaza y Janes Editores Colombia s.a., pp. 1–167, ISBN 958-140-008-7
