= List of Muisca and pre-Muisca scholars =

This list contains Muisca and pre-Muisca scholars; researchers, historians, archaeologists, anthropologists and other investigators who have contributed to the current knowledge of the Muisca and their ancestors of the prehistory of the Altiplano Cundiboyacense and of the preceramic and ceramic Herrera Periods.

Other than the Mesoamericanists and scholars of the Incas, Muisca scholars are not too abundant. Most of the early Muisca knowledge comes from the Spanish conquistadores and missionaries working in the Americas.

== List of Muisca and pre-Muisca scholars ==
Name	Century	Main topics	Notable works	Image
Joaquín Acosta	19th	Geology, natural history, biographies, numerals	Compendio histórico del descubrimiento y colonización de la Nueva Granada en el siglo décimo sexto	
Pedro de Aguado	16th	History	Recopilación historial	
Jesús Arango Cano	20th	Mythology, religion	Mitos, leyendas y dioses chibchas	
Sylvia M. Broadbent	20th	Agriculture	Investigaciones arqueológicas en el Territorio Chibcha	
Marianne Cardale de Schrimpff	21st	Archaeology, agriculture	En busca de los primeros agricultores del Altiplano Cundiboyacense	
Juan de Castellanos	16th	Poetry, conquest, ethnography, ethnology	Elegías de varones ilustres de Indias	
Juan F. Cobo Betancourt	21st	History, religion, culture	The Coming of the Kingdom: The Muisca, Catholic Reform, and Spanish Colonialism in the New Kingdom of Granada.	
Gonzalo Correal Urrego	21st	Archaeology, Aguazuque, Tequendama	Aguazuque: Evidence of hunter-gatherers and growers on the high plains of the Eastern Ranges	
José Domingo Duquesne	18th	Calendar	Disertación sobre el calendario de los muyscas, indios naturales de este Nuevo Reino de Granada	
Marcos Jiménez de la Espada	19th	Publication of Epítome	Epítome de la conquista del Nuevo Reino de Granada, N.N., 1979 (1887)	
Lucas Fernández de Piedrahita	17th	History, conquest, mythology, religion	Historia general de las conquistas del Nuevo Reino de Granada	
Juan Friede	20th	Ethnology, history, Epítome de la conquista del Nuevo Reino de Granada	Los Chibchas bajo la dominación española	
Jorge Gamboa Mendoza	21st	History, anthropology, conquest	Los muiscas, grupos indígenas del Nuevo Reino de Granada. Una nueva propuesta sobre su organizacíon socio-política y su evolucíon en el siglo XVI	
Ana María Groot	21st	Anthropology, archaeology, Muisca women, Checua	Checua: Una secuencia cultural entre 8500 y 3000 años antes del presente	
Thomas van der Hammen	21st	Geology, biodiversity, botany, El Abra, prehistory, Lake Humboldt	Stratigraphy and environment of the Upper Quaternary of the El Abra corridor and rock shelters (Colombia)	
Alexander von Humboldt	19th	Geography, biodiversity, calendar, numerals, et al.	Le voyage aux régions equinoxiales du Nouveau Continent	
Manuel Arturo Izquierdo Peña	21st	Astronomy, calendar	The Muisca Calendar: An approximation to the timekeeping system of the ancient native people of the northeastern Andes of Colombia	
Gonzalo Jiménez de Quesada	16th	First contact	Memoria de los descubridores, que entraron conmigo a descubrir y conquistar el Reino de Granada	
Carl Henrik Langebaek Rueda	21st	Archaeology, society, El Infiernito	Arqueología Regional en el Territorio Muisca: Juego de Datos del Proyecto Valle de Fúquene	
Bernardo de Lugo	17th	Chibcha, numerals	Gramática en la lengua general del Nuevo Reyno, llamada mosca	
Carmen Millán de Benavides	21st	Epítome de la conquista del Nuevo Reino de Granada	Epítome de la Conquista del Nuevo Reino de Granada and the Knowledge Through Questionnaire. Spanish Cosmography of the 16th Century	
Javier Ocampo López	21st	History, folklore, mythology, religion	Mitos y leyendas indígenas de Colombia	
Gerardo Reichel-Dolmatoff	20th	Anthropology, archaeology	Goldwork and Shamanism : an iconographic study of the Gold Museum of the Banco de la República, Colombia	
Juan Rodríguez Freyle	17th	Spanish conquest, El Dorado	El Carnero - Conquista y descubrimiento del Nuevo Reino de Granada de las Indias Occidentales del Mar Océano, y Fundación de la ciudad de Santafé de Bogotá, primera de este reino donde se fundó la Real Audiencia y Cancillería, siendo la cabeza se hizo su arzobispado	
Eliécer Silva Celis	20th	Anthropology, archaeology, reconstructed Sun Temple	Arqueología y prehistoria de Colombia	
Pedro Simón	17th	History, conquest, mythology, religion	Noticias historiales de las conquistas de Tierra Firme en las Indias occidentales (1882-92) vol.1-5	
Miguel Triana	20th	History	La civilización Chibcha	
Ezequiel Uricoechea	19th	Linguistics	Antigüedades Neogranadinas	
Liborio Zerda	19th	Ethnology, conquest, El Dorado, numerals	El Dorado	
José Rozo Gauta	21st	Muisca medicine and cosmovision; traditional songs in the muisca heritage area	Espacio y tiempo entre los Muiscas	
Hope Henderson	21st	Muisca concept of house ("gue" in the Chibchan Bogotà dialect of dictionaries)	Muisca Settlement organization and chiefly authority at Suta, Valle de Leyva, Colombia	
Ana María Boada Rivas	21st	Nature of muisca elites	The evolution of social hierarchy in a Muisca Chiefdom of the northern Andes of Colombia	

== See also ==
- List of Muisca research institutes
- Muisca
- Mayanist
- Inca scholars
