= Bernardo de Lugo =

Colombian linguist

Fray Bernardo de Lugo
- Born: late 16th century New Kingdom of Granada
- Died: 17th century
- Writing career
- Language: Spanish, Chibcha
- Subjects: Chibcha, numerals
- Notable works: Gramática en la lengua general del Nuevo Reyno, llamada mosca (1619)

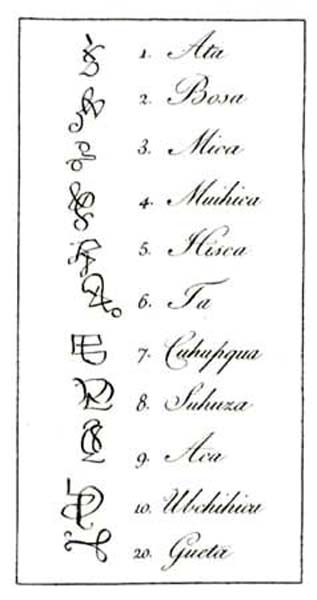
Muisca numerals (1-10 and 20) in the Muisca script

Fray Bernardo de Lugo (born late 16th century, New Kingdom of Granada) was a Spanish Neogranadine linguist, friar and writer. He has been an important contributor to the knowledge about the Chibcha language (also called "Muisca" or in its own language "Muysccubun") of the Muisca, having published the oldest surviving work on the language in 1619.

Later linguists and chroniclers, such as Ezequiel Uricoechea, based their work on the texts of Bernardo de Lugo. Various modern scholars have reprinted the work or published reviews, among others Jorge Gamboa Mendoza (2010), Nicholas Ostler (1995) and Manuel Alvar (1977).

== Biography ==
Little is known about the life of Bernardo de Lugo, born late in the sixteenth century in the New Kingdom of Granada, where he became a Dominican friar. In 1615 De Lugo starting preaching in Chibcha after being appointed as magister linguae indorum. On August 1, 1617, friar Gabriel Giménez send him an omission to write a book on the Chibcha language and grammar. De Lugo finished his work early 1618 and the manuscript was sent to Madrid, Spain where it was edited by Bernardino de Guzmán and published in 1619. Bernardo de Lugo was unable to correct the proofs of the work and under the strict royal privilege it was forbidden to reprint the work for ten years, fined by 50,000 maravedis. An accompanying catechismus and dictionary are said to have been written but those weren't published.

The work on Chibcha is the oldest surviving transcript of the extinct indigenous language. Historical records show that twelve earlier works must have existed but they do not remain. Earlier writers about the Chibcha language were among others Gonzalo Bermúdez and José Daddei. De Lugo's book, Gramática en la lengua general del Nuevo Reyno, llamada mosca ("Grammar in the general language of the New Kingdom, called Mosca [Muisca]"), started with three sonnets; one in Spanish and two in Chibcha. The Chibcha language is written in a transcription. The book contains 162 pages.

The first sonnet in Chibcha, throughout the book called Chibcha and Muisca, begins with:

MVγ≈ca micâta cubun cħoqγ vca≈ûca

The sonnets praise the person Bernardo de Lugo, suggesting they were written by a friendly colleague. The only reference in the text to the author is chicubun, which means "our language". Alvar described the work of De Lugo as "de Lugo writes for those who don't understand Chibcha".

== Trivia ==
The language institute of the Universidad Santo Tomás in Bogotá has been named honouring Bernardo de Lugo

== See also ==
- List of Muisca scholars
- Chibcha language
- Muisca numerals

== Bibliography ==
- Alvar, Manuel (1977), "La gramática mosca de Fray Bernardo de Lugo - The Muisca grammar of Friar Bernardo de Lugo" (PDF), Boletín del Instituto Caro y Cuervo, XXXII (in Spanish), 3, Madrid, Spain: Universidad Complutense: 461–500, archived from the original (PDF) on 2016-10-12
- Gamboa Mendoza, Jorge (2010), Gramática en la Lengua General Del Nuevo Reino, Llamada Mosca - Grammar in the general language of the New Kingdom, called Mosca (Muisca) (in Spanish), Bogotá, Colombia: Instituto Colombiano de Antropología e Historia, pp. 1–191, ISBN 978-9588181653
- Lugo, Bernardo de (1619), Gramática en la lengua general del Nuevo Reyno, llamada mosca - Grammar in the general language of the New Kingdom, called Mosca [Muisca] (in Spanish), Madrid, Spain, pp. 1–162
- Ostler, Nicholas (1995), "Fray Bernardo de Lugo: Two Sonnets in Muisca" (PDF), Amerindia, 19–20, Paris, France: 1–13
