= Manuel Arturo Izquierdo Peña =

Colombian anthropologist

- Education: Université de Montréal
- Known for: Analysis of the Muisca calendar
- Scientific career
- Fields: Archaeoastronomy, Muisca astronomy
- Institutions: Universidad Nacional de Colombia, Université de Montréal
- Thesis: The Muisca Calendar: An approximation to the timekeeping system of the ancient native people of the northeastern Andes of Colombia (2008)

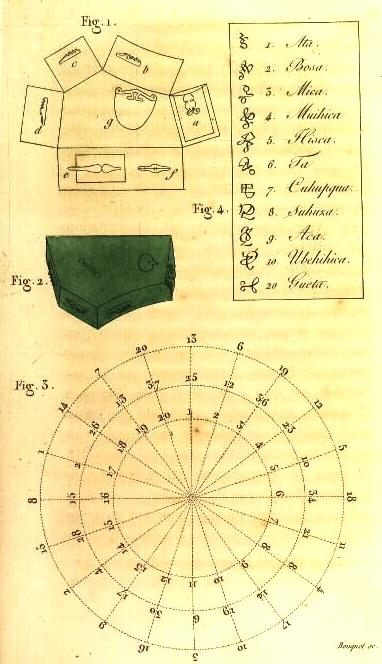
Sketch of the complex Muisca calendar by Alexander von Humboldt

Manuel Arturo Izquierdo Peña is a Colombian anthropologist who has contributed to the knowledge of the Muisca and other pre-Columbian cultures, among others San Agustín, Colombia. His main work has been on archaeoastronomy of the Muisca calendar.

== Biography ==
Izquierdo Peña obtained his degree in anthropology from the Universidad Nacional de Colombia in 1997 and published his thesis titled Prospección arqueoastronómica en la cultura de San Agustín ("Archeoastronomical prospection in the San Agustín culture") in 1998.

In 2008 he published his MSc. Thesis at the Université de Montréal titled The Muisca Calendar: An approximation to the timekeeping system of the ancient native people of the northeastern Andes of Colombia in which he analyzed the Muisca calendar, a complex lunisolar calendar used by the Muisca of the Altiplano Cundiboyacense. In this publication and later work Izquierdo Peña analyzed the work by Muisca scholars José Domingo Duquesne, Alexander von Humboldt, Vicente Restrepo and Pedro Simón on the Muisca calendar. He also described the Choachí Stone, a rock artifact found in the village of Choachí in the 1940s that probably was a calculator for the use of the complex calendar.

== Publications ==
- 2014 - Calendario Muisca ("Muisca calendar")
- 2009 - The Muisca Calendar: An approximation to the timekeeping system of the ancient native people of the northeastern Andes of Colombia
- 2001 - Astronomia para Todos ("Astronomy for everyone")
- 2000 - Arqueoastronomia en Colombia ("Archeoastronomy in Colombia")
- 1999 - Los Astrónomos de Piedra ("The stone astronomers")

== See also ==
- Archaeoastronomy
- List of Muisca scholars
- Muisca astronomy, calendar

- El Infiernito, Carl Henrik Langebaek

- Liborio Zerda
- José Domingo Duquesne

== Bibliography ==
- Izquierdo Peña, Manuel Arturo (2014), Calendario Muisca - Muisca calendar (video) (in Spanish)
- Izquierdo Peña, Manuel Arturo (2009), "The Muisca Calendar: An approximation to the timekeeping system of the ancient native people of the northeastern Andes of Colombia", pp. 1–170, arXiv:0812.0574 [physics.hist-ph]
