= Muisca numerals =

Number system used by the Muisca

Muisca numerals were the numeric notation system used by the Muisca, one of the civilizations of the Americas before the Spanish conquest of the Muisca. Just like the Mayas, the Muisca had a vigesimal numerical system, based on multiples of twenty (Chibcha: gueta). The Muisca numerals were based on counting with fingers and toes. They had specific numbers from one to ten, yet for the numbers between eleven and nineteen they used "foot one" (11) to "foot nine" (19). The number 20 was the 'perfect' number for the Muisca which is visible in their calendar. To calculate higher numbers than 20 they used multiples of their 'perfect' number; gue-muyhica would be "20 times 4", so 80. To describe "50" they used "20 times 2 plus 10"; gue-bosa asaqui ubchihica, transcribed from guêboʒhas aſaqɣ hubchìhicâ. In their calendar, which was lunisolar, they only counted from one to ten and twenty. Each number had a special meaning, related to their deities and certain animals, especially the abundant toads.

For the representation of their numbers they used digits inspired by their natural surroundings, especially toads; ata ("one") and aca ("nine") were both derived from the animals so abundant on the Bogotá savanna and other parts of the Altiplano Cundiboyacense where the Muisca lived in their confederation.

The most important scholars who provided knowledge about the Muisca numerals were Bernardo de Lugo (1619), Pedro Simón (17th century), Alexander von Humboldt and José Domingo Duquesne (late 18th and 19th century) and Liborio Zerda.

== Numerals ==
The Muisca used a vigesimal counting system and counted primarily with their fingers and secondarily with their toes. Their system went from 1 to 10 and for higher numerations they used the prefix quihicha or qhicha, which means "foot" in their Chibcha language Muysccubun. Eleven became thus "foot one", twelve: "foot two", etc. As in the other pre-Columbian civilizations, the number 20 was special. It was the total number of all body extremities; fingers and toes. The Muisca used two forms to express twenty: "foot ten"; quihícha ubchihica or their exclusive word gueta, derived from gue, which means "house". Numbers between 20 and 30 were counted gueta asaqui ata ("twenty plus one"; 21), gueta asaqui ubchihica ("twenty plus ten"; 30). Larger numbers were counted as multiples of twenty; gue-bosa ("20 times 2"; 40), gue-hisca ("20 times 5"; 100).

Muisca numerals as depicted by Acosta, Von Humboldt and Zerda

The numeral symbols were first provided by Duquesne and reproduced by Humboldt, Acosta, and Zerda. These glyphs have been criticized and their authenticity questioned, as they are “practically nonexistent” in the surviving archaeological record, including the calendar stone from Choachí. Potentially, they might represent asterisms or months instead of numerals.

Numbers
Number	Humboldt, 1878	De Lugo, 1619
1	ata	ata
2	bozha / bosa	boʒha
3	mica	mica
4	mhuyca / muyhica	mhuɣcâ
5	hicsca / hisca	hɣcſcâ
6	taa	taa
7	qhupqa / cuhupqua	qhûpqâ
8	shuzha / suhuza	shûʒhâ
9	aca	aca
10	hubchibica / ubchihica	hubchìhicâ
11	quihicha ata	qhicħâ ata
12	quihicha bosa	qhicħâ boʒha
13	quihicha mica	qhicħâ mica
14	quihicha mhuyca	qhicħâ mhuɣcâ
15	quihicha hisca	qhicħâ hɣcſcâ
16	quihicha ta	qhicħâ ta
17	quihicha cuhupqua	qhicħâ qhûpqâ
18	quihicha suhuza	qhicħâ shûʒhâ
19	quihicha aca	qhicħâ aca
20	gueta	guêata
21	guetas asaqui ata	guêatas aſaqɣ ata
30	guetas asaqui ubchihica	guêatas aſaqɣ hubchìhicâ
40	gue-bosa	guêboʒha
50	gue-bosa asaqui ubchihica	guêboʒhas aſaqɣ hubchìhicâ
60	gue-mica	guêmica
70	gue-mica asaqui ubchihica	guêmicas aſaqɣ hubchìhicâ
80	gue-muyhica	guêmhuɣcâ
90	gue-muyhica asaqui ubchihica	guêmhuɣcâs aſaqɣ hubchìhicâ
99	gue-muyhica asaqui quihicha aca	guêmhuɣcâs aſaqɣ qhicħâ aca
100	gue-hisca	guêhɣcſcâ
101	gue-hisca asaqui ata	guêhɣcſcâs aſaqɣ ata
110	gue-hisca asaqui hubchihica	guêhɣcſcâs aſaqɣ hubchìhicâ
120	gue-ta	guêta
150	gue-cuhupqua asaqui hubchihica	guêqhûpqâs aſaqɣ hubchìhicâ
199	gue-aca asaqui quihicha aca	guêacas aſaqɣ qhicħâ aca
200	gue-ubchihica	guêhubchìhicâ
250	gue-quihicha bozha asaqui hubchihica	guêqhicħâ boʒhas aſaqɣ hubchìhicâ
300	gue-chihica hisca	guêqhicħâ hɣcſcâ
365	gue-chihica suhuza asaqui hisca	guêqhicħâ shûʒhâs aſaqɣ hɣcſcâ
399	gue-chihica aca asaqui quihicha aca	guêqhicħâ acas aſaqɣ qhicħâ aca

== See also ==
- Muisca art
- Muysccubun
- Quipu - Inca numerals
- Muisca calendar
- Maya numerals
