= José Domingo Duquesne =

Colombian theologist and scientist

- José Domingo Duquesne; Engraving by Antonio Rodríguez (1882)
- Born: February 23, 1748; Bogotá, Viceroyalty of New Granada
- Died: August 30, 1822 (aged 74); Bogotá, Gran Colombia
- Writing career
- Language: Spanish
- Subjects: Chibcha language, Muisca calendar, Muisca numerals
- Notable works: Disertación sobre el calendario de los muyscas, indios naturales de este Nuevo Reino de Granada

José Domingo Duquesne (23 February 1748, Bogotá – 30 August 1822, Bogotá) was a Colombian clergyman, theologist, scientist and writer. Polyglot Duquesne spoke Spanish, French, Latin, Greek, Italian and Chibcha.

== Biography ==
José Domingo Duquesne was born on February 23, 1748, in Bogotá, then the capital of the Viceroyalty of New Granada. His parents were Frenchman Juan Francisco Duquesne, originally from Montpellier, and Clara Ignacia de la Madrid, from Bogotá. He attended the Colegio Mayor y Seminario de San Bartolomé graduating in 1774 in canon law and theology. Remarkable for his day and studies, during his dissertation on philosophy Duquesne treated the natural sciences.

From 1775 to 1795 Duquesne was assigned to the indigenous villages Lenguazaque and Gachancipá and studied Muysccubun, the language of the Muisca. This was the first recorded study of the almost extinct language as education in the language was forbidden by the authorities of the Spanish Empire in 1577 and in 1638 the last bilingual school was closed. After ten years of service in Lenguazaque, as of July 13, 1785, Duquesne was working in the parrochy of the church in Gachancipá.

In 1795 Duquesne published his work Disertación sobre el calendario de los muyscas, indios naturales de este Nuevo Reino de Granada ("Dissertation about the calendar of the Muyscas [sic], native indians of this New Kingdom of Granada"). In this work he unraveled the complex lunisolar Muisca calendar. José Celestino Mutis handed Duquesne's work over to the famous natural scientist Alexander von Humboldt who visited the Colombian territories in 1801.

After publishing his work on the Muisca calendar, the Muisca numerals and grammar of the Chibcha language, Duquesne was appointed canon of the cathedral of Bogotá, by Charles IV, the King of Spain in 1800. To the capital and his birthplace he took his knowledge about the language and calendar of the Muisca together with an interpretation of the until then uncyphered fr:Ælia Lælia Crispis.

Duquesne retired in 1819 and died on August 30, 1822.

== Trivia ==
- The school Colegio José Domingo Duquesne in Gachancipá has been named in honour of Duquesne

== See also ==
- Muisca astronomy, Muisca calendar, Muisca numerals
- Manuel Arturo Izquierdo Peña, anthropologist who analysed the work of Duquesne

== Bibliography ==
- Duquesne, José Domingo (1795), Disertación sobre el calendario de los muyscas, indios naturales de este Nuevo Reino de Granada - Dissertation about the Muisca calendar, indigenous people of this New Kingdom of Granada (PDF) (in Spanish), pp. 1–17
- Duquesne, José Domingo (24 September 1809), Oración por la tranquilidad pública - Sermon for the public peace (PDF) (in Spanish), archived from the original (PDF) on 2017-05-10
- Duquesne, José Domingo (19 January 1809), Oración pronunciada de orden - Sermon for the order (PDF) (in Spanish), archived from the original (PDF) on 2017-05-10
- Zerda, Liborio (1947) [1883], El Dorado (PDF) (in Spanish), archived from the original (PDF) on 2019-07-07
