= Muisca language =

Language of Colombia, spoken by the Muisca

Muisca
- Mosca, Chibcha
- Muysc cubun
- Pronunciation: Chibcha pronunciation: [*mʷɨsk kuβun]
- Native to: Colombia
- Region: Bogotá savanna, Altiplano Cundiboyacense
- Ethnicity: Muisca
- Extinct: by 1765
- Revival: (undated figure of >150 speakers)
- Language family: Chibchan: Core; Magdalenic; Southern; Muisca–Duit; Muisca
- Writing system: only numerals

Language codes
- ISO 639-2: chb
- ISO 639-3: chb
- Glottolog: chib1270
- Linguasphere: 81-EFA-ca
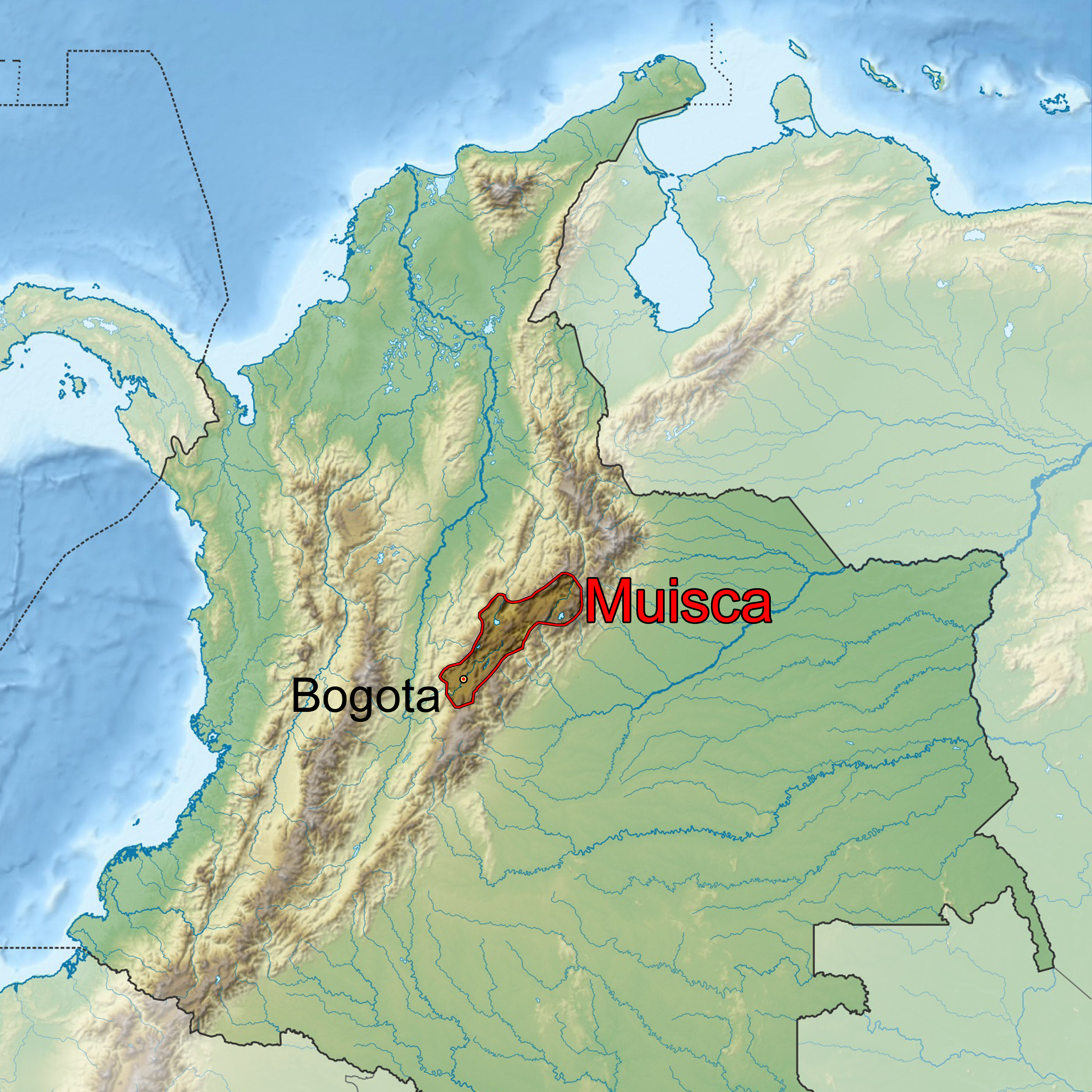
- Map of Muisca people and language

Mysccubun, Muisca or Muysca (*/ˈmɨska/ *Chibcha pronunciation: [ˈmʷɨska]), also known as Chibcha, Mosca and Muysca, is a language formerly spoken by the Muisca or Mysca people, one of the many indigenous cultures of the Americas. Today, the Muisca people continue to inhabit the Savanna of Bogotá and the territories of Cundinamarca, Boyacá, Santander and beyond (also known as Altiplano Cundiboyacense) in Colombia, although their continued presence is still largely unknown to many.

"Chibcha" was, according to Pedro Simón, the language's indigenous name, however colonial-era dictionaries contradict this and indicate the indigenous name was muysccubun.

== Name ==
The name of the language Muysc cubun means 'language of the people', from muysca 'people' and cubun 'language' or 'word'.

== Revival ==
Despite the disappearance of the language in the 17th century (approximately), several language revitalization processes are underway within the current Mysca communities. The Mysca people remain ethnically distinct and their communities are recognized by the Colombian state.

An important revival-effort has been provided by the Mysca communities or cabildos in different locations around Colombia.

=== Modern uses ===
==== Education ====
The only public school in Colombia currently teaching Chibcha (to about 150 children) is in the town of Cota, about 30 kilometres (19 mi) by road from Bogotá. The school is named Jizcamox (healing with the hands) in Chibcha.

== Dialects ==
Modern Muisca scholars such as Diego Gómez have found that the variety of languages was much larger than previously thought and that in fact there was a Chibcha dialect continuum that extended throughout the Cordillera Oriental from the Sierra Nevada del Cocuy to the Sumapaz Páramo. The quick colonization of the Spanish and the improvised use of traveling translators reduced the differences between the versions of Chibcha over time. The language recorded in dictionaries was only the dialect spoken around the colonial capital-city of Santafé de Bogotá.

== Classification ==
The Mysca language is part of the Chibcha linguistic family. The Chibcha linguistic family includes several indigenous languages of Central America and Northwestern South America. The language is within the Magdalenic language sub-group.

== History ==
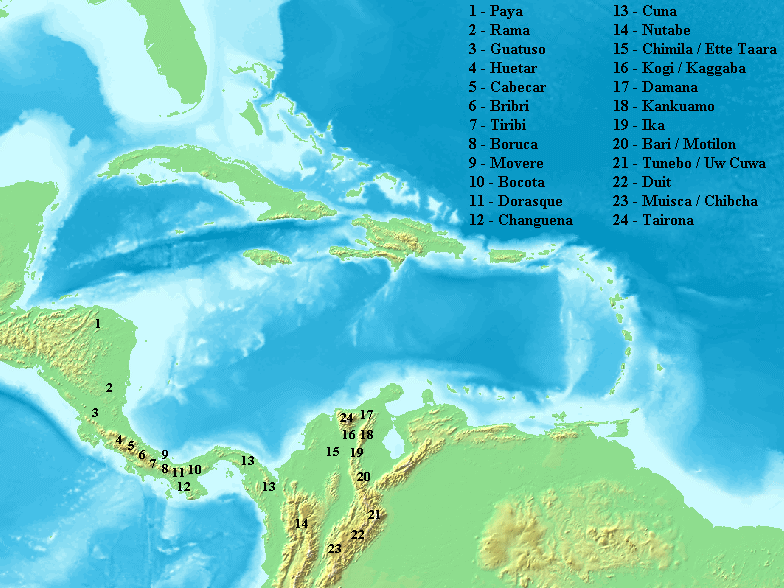
Distribution of Chibchan languages across southern Central and northwestern South America. The southernmost (23) is Muisca.

In prehistorical times, in the Andean civilizations called preceramic, the population of northwestern South America migrated through the Darién Gap between the isthmus of Panama and Colombia. Other Chibchan languages are spoken in southern Central America and the Muisca and related indigenous groups took their language with them into the heart of Colombia where they comprised the Muisca Confederation, a cultural grouping.

=== Spanish colonization ===
As early as 1580 the authorities in Charcas, Quito, and Santa Fe de Bogotá mandated the establishment of schools in native languages and required that priests study these languages before ordination. In 1606 the entire clergy was ordered to provide religious instruction in Chibcha. The Chibcha language declined in the 18th century.

In 1770, King Charles III of Spain officially banned use of the language in the region as part of a de-indigenization project. The ban remained in law until Colombia passed its constitution of 1991.

=== Modern history ===
Currently, the "Sociedad Geográfica de Colombia" or Colombian Geographical Society offers a series of books called "Curso de lengua Muisca" Muysca Language Course, divided into different levels (1, 2 and 3). These books cover vocabulary, songs, everyday expressions and grammar to help learners speak Muysccubun, the Muisca language.

Since 2008 a Spanish–Muyscubun dictionary containing more than 3000 words has been published online. The project was partly financed by the University of Bergen, Norway.

== Documentation ==
The sources of the Muysca language are seven documents prepared in the first decade of the 17th century and are considered a legitimate and reliable documentary set of the language. Important scholars who have contributed to the knowledge of the Muisca language include Juan de Castellanos, Bernardo de Lugo, José Domingo Duquesne and Ezequiel Uricoechea.

=== RM 158 ===
Manuscript 158 of the National Library of Colombia has a Grammar, an annex called "Modos de hablar en la lengua Mosca o Chipcha" [sic], a Spanish-Muysca vocabulary and a "Catheçismo en la lengua Mosca o Chipcha" [sic]. It was transcribed by María Stella González and published by the Caro y Cuervo Institute in 1987. According to the researcher, this manuscript "was written at times when the language was still spoken." González's transcription has been one of the most consulted works by modern linguists interested in the language.

=== Manuscripts from the Biblioteca Real de Palacio ===
Three documents from the Biblioteca Real de Palacio are compendiums of the Muysca language and are part of the so-called Mutis Collection, a set of linguistic-missionary documents of several indigenous languages of the New Kingdom of Granada and the Captaincy General of Venezuela, collected by Mutis, due to the initial wishes of the Tsarina of Russia Catherine the Great, who wanted to create a dictionary of all the languages of the world

==== Manuscript II/2922 ====
This manuscript is made up of three books: the first titled "De la gramática breve de la lengua Mosca"; the second contains three titles: "Confesionarios en la Lengua Mosca chibcha" [sic], "Oraciones en Lengua Mosca chibcha" [sic] and "Catecismo breve en Lengua Mosca chibcha" [sic]; The third book is titled "Bocabulario de la Lengua Chibcha o Mosca" [sic]. It was transcribed by Diego Gómez and Diana Girlado between 2012 and 2013.

==== Manuscript II/2923 and Manuscript II/2924 ====
These manuscripts are actually a single vocabulary, one copies the other. The first was transcribed by Quesada Pacheco in 1991 and the second by Gómez y Giraldo between 2012 and 2013

=== Lugo Grammar ===
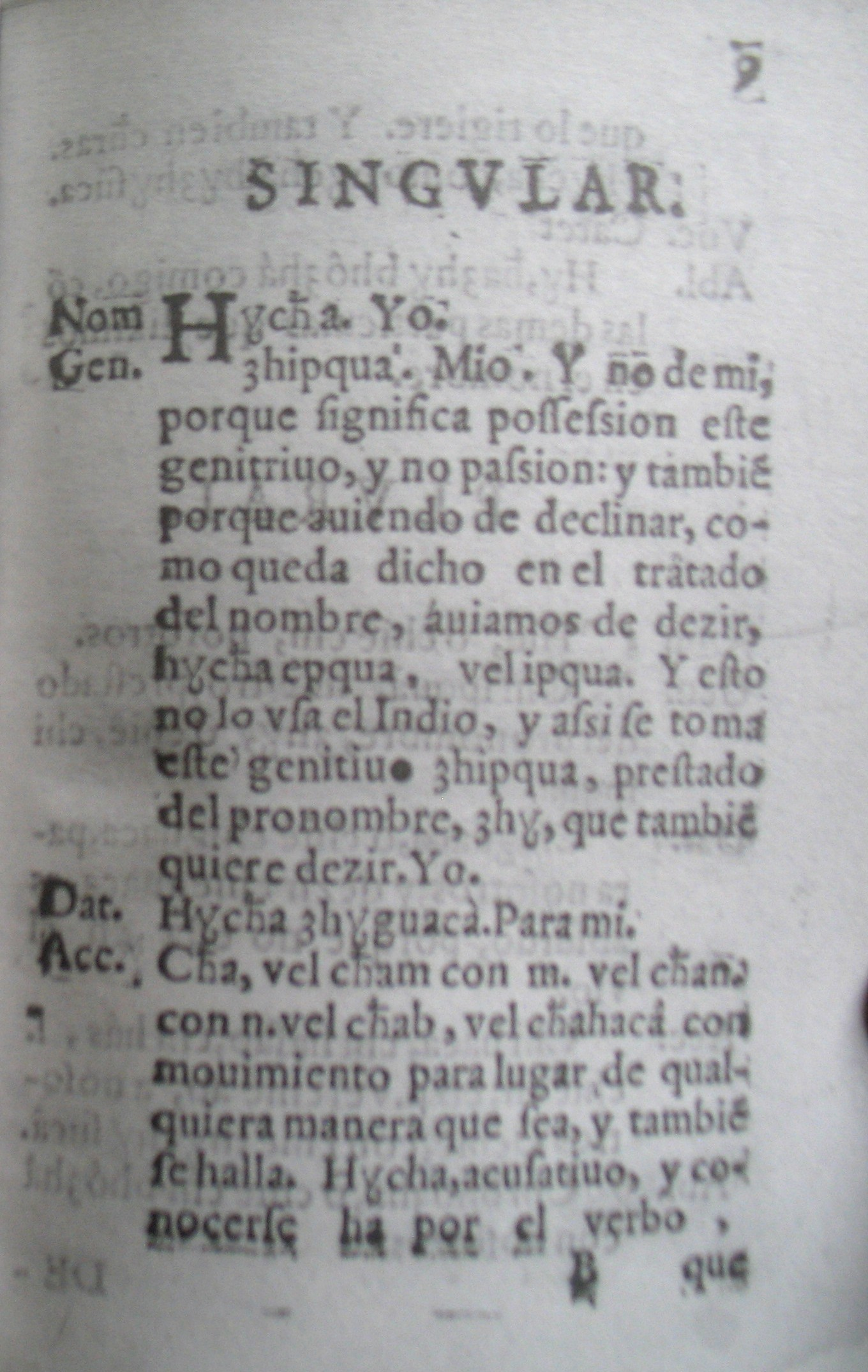
Folio 9 recto of Gramática en la lengua general del Nuevo Reino, llamada Mosca, by fray Bernardo de Lugo, printed in Madrid, Spain, in 1619.

It was published in Madrid, Spain, in the year 1619. It consists of a grammar, a confessional in Spanish and a confessional in Muysca. For the elaboration of his work, Lugo devised a sort or type in order to express a vowel that was not part of the phonetic inventory of Spanish and that was necessary to capture if a correct pronunciation was wanted, he called it "Inverse Ipsilon" and today we know it as "The Lugo's y". In other sources it appears simply expressed with the grapheme y.

=== The Bodleian Library pamphlets ===
Recently, a couple of doctrinal texts of the Muysca language were discovered in the Bodleian Library, which were sewn into the final part of an anonymous grammar of the Quechua language, published in Seville in 1603. The first of them is a brief Grammar, and the second a brief Christian Doctrine. These pamphlets are considered the earliest known texts of the General Language of the New Kingdom of Granada and although their orthography is inconsistent and a little different from the known ones, these pamphlets are associated with the variety spoken in Santafé and its surroundings

== Phonology ==
Because Muisca is an extinct language, various scholars as Adolfo Constenla (1984), González de Pérez (2006) and Willem Adelaar with the collaboration of Pieter Muysken (2004) have formulated different phonological systems from the available data.

=== Adolfo Constenla ===
The proposal of Adolfo Constenla, a Costa Rican scholar of Chibchan, has been the basis of the other proposals and his appreciations are still valid, even more so because they were the result of the use of the comparative method with other Chibcha languages and lexicostatistics.

==== Consonants ====
| | | Bilabial | Alveolar | Palatal | Velar | Labiovelar | Glottal |
|---|---|---|---|---|---|---|---|
| Plosive | | p | t | tʲ | k | p͡kʷ / p͡k | |
| Affricate | | | ts | | | | |
| Fricative | voiceless | | s | | | | h |
| Fricative | voiced | β | | | ɣ | | |
| Nasal | | m | n | | | | |
| Vibrant | | | r | | | | |
| Approximant | | | | j | | w | |

==== Vowels ====
| | Front | Central | Back |
|---|---|---|---|
| Close | i | ɨ | u |
| Mid | e | | o |
| Open | | a | |

=== Adelaar & Muysken ===
In The languages of the Andes, Willem Adelaar and Pieter Muysken present a phonological chart based on the orthography developed during the colonial period, which diverges in some aspects from that used in Spanish according to the needs of the language.

==== Consonants ====
| | | Bilabial | Alveolar | Palatal | Velar | Labiovelar | Glottal |
|---|---|---|---|---|---|---|---|
| Plosive | | p | t | tʲ | k | p͡kʷ / p͡k | |
| Affricate | | | ts | tʃ | | | |
| Fricative | voiceless | ɸ | s | ʃ | | | h |
| Fricative | voiced | β | | | ɣ | | |
| Nasal | | m | n | | | | |
| Vibrant | | | r | | | | |
| Approximant | | | | j | | w | |

==== Vowels ====
| | Front | Central | Back |
|---|---|---|---|
| Close | i | ɨ | u |
| Mid | e | | o |
| Open | | a | |

=== Proposal by González ===
In his book Aproximación al sistema fonológico de la lengua muisca, González presents the following phonological table.

==== Consonants ====
| | | Bilabial | Alveolar | Retroflex | Palatal | Velar | Glottal |
|---|---|---|---|---|---|---|---|
| Plosive | | p | t | | | k | |
| Affricate | | | | tʂ | | | |
| Fricative | voiceless | | s | ʂ | | | h |
| Fricative | voiced | β | | | | ɣ | |
| Nasal | | m | n | | | | |
| Approximant | | | | | (j) | (w) | |

González does not present approximants, although she considers [w] as a semivocalic extension of bilabial consonants, as Adolfo Constenla presented it at the time, for example in cusmuy *[kusmʷɨ], */kusmɨ/, she considers it a phonetic characteristic and not a phonological one.

==== Vowels ====
| | Front | Central | Back |
|---|---|---|---|
| Close | i | ɨ | u |
| Mid | e | | o |
| Open | | a | |

=== Proposal by Gómez ===
For the Muysc Cubun Research Group's website from the National University of Colombia, Diego Gómez uses the following inventory for its phonetic reconstructions.

==== Consonants ====
| | | Bilabial | Alveolar | | | Postalveolar | Palatal | Alveolar | | | Glottal |
| | | Bilabial | Plain | Labialized | Palatalized | Postalveolar | Palatal | Plain | Labialized | Palatalized | Glottal |
|---|---|---|---|---|---|---|---|---|---|---|---|
| Plosive | voiceless | | t | tʷ | tʲ | | | k | kʷ | kʲ | |
| Plosive | voiced | b | d͡z | d͡zʷ | | | | ɡ | ɡʷ | | |
| Affricate | | | t͡s | | | t͡ʃ | | | | | |
| Fricative | voiceless | | s | | | ʃ | ɕ | | | | h |
| Fricative | voiced | | z | | | ʒ | | | | | |
| Nasal | | m | n | | | | | | | | |
| Approximant | oral | w | | | | | j | | | | |
| Approximant | nasal | w̃ | | | | | | | | | |

==== Vowels ====
| | Front | Central | Back |
|---|---|---|---|
| Close | i | | u |
| Mid | e | ə | o |
| Open | | a | |

All vowels can be plain, glottalized, or aspirated.

== Grammar ==
Muysca is an agglutinative language, characterized by roots that are usually monosyllabic or bisyllabic (to a lesser extent longer), which combine to form extensive expressions. Typologically, it is a final core language. In addition, it is an inflectional language, which means that the roots receive prefixes and suffixes. The closest living language to Muysca is Uwa. Compared to other northern Chibcha languages, Muysca presents more recent innovations.

=== Nouns ===
In Muysca, nouns do not decline for gender, number, or case. If these are to be specified, adjectives can be applied to the noun.

fulano muysca cha cho guy
fulano person male good COP
So-and-so is a good male

muysca fuhucha cho
person woman good
Good woman

=== Adjective ===
Adjectives do not agree with the noun they modify. According to its form, it can be basic, derived or periphrastic.

The periphrastic form, to form a predicative expression, uses the 3rd person + verbal root/name (+n) + ma-gue:

a-taba-n ma-gue
3-meanness-FOC 2-COP
he/she/it is stingy

== Vocabulary ==
=== Numbers ===
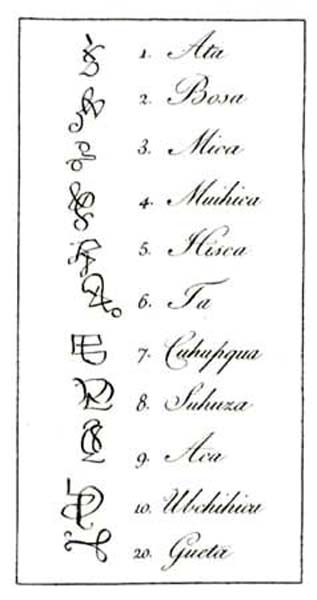
Numbers 1-10 and 20 in Chibcha

Counting 1 to 10 in Chibcha is ata, boza, mica, muyhyca, hyzca, taa, cuhupqua, suhuza, aca, hubchihica. The Muisca only had individual lexemes for the numbers one to ten and the number 20: gueta, used extensively in their complex lunisolar Muisca calendar. For numbers higher than 10 they used additions; quihicha ata ("ten plus one") for eleven. Higher numbers were multiplications of twenty; guehyzca would be "five times twenty"; 100.

=== Words ===
This list is a selection from the online dictionary and is sortable. Note the different potatoes and types of maize and their meaning.

| Muysccubun | English |
|---|---|
| aba | "maize" |
| aso | "parrot" |
| ba | "finger" or "finger tip" |
| bhosioiomy | "potato [black inside]" (species unknown) |
| chihiza | "vein" (of blood) or "root" |
| cho | "good" |
| chyscamuy | "maize [dark]" (species unknown) |
| chysquyco | "green" or "blue" |
| coca | "finger nail" |
| fo | "fox" |
| foaba | Phytolacca bogotensis, plant used as soap |
| fun | "bread" |
| funzaiomy | "potato [black]" (species unknown) |
| fusuamuy | "maize [not very coloured]" (species unknown) |
| gaca | "feather" |
| gaxie | "small" |
| gazaiomy | "potato [wide]" (species unknown) |
| guahaia | "dead body" |
| guexica | "grandfather" and "grandmother" |
| guia | "bear" or "older brother/sister" |
| hichuamuy | "maize [of rice]" (species and meaning unknown) |
| hosca | "tobacco" |
| iome | "potato" (Solanum tuberosum) |
| iomgy | "flower of potato plant" |
| iomza | "potato" (species unknown) |
| iomzaga | "potato [small]" (species unknown) |
| muyhyza | "flea" (Tunga penetrans) |
| muyhyzyso | "lizard" |
| nygua | "salt" |
| nyia | "gold" or "money" |
| phochuba | "maize [soft and red]" (species and meaning unknown) |
| pquaca | "arm" |
| pquihiza | "lightning" |
| quye | "tree" or "leaf" |
| quyecho | "arrow" |
| quyhysaiomy | "potato [floury]" (species unknown) |
| quyiomy | "potato [long]" (species unknown) |
| saca | "nose" |
| sasamuy | "maize [reddish]" (species unknown) |
| simte | "owl [white]" |
| soche | "white-tailed deer" |
| suque | "soup" |
| tyba | "hi!" (to a friend) |
| tybaiomy | "potato [yellow]" (species unknown) |
| xiua | "rain" or "lake" |
| usua | "white river clay" |
| uamuyhyca | "fish"; Eremophilus mutisii |
| xieiomy | "potato [white]" (species unknown) |
| xui | "broth" |
| ysy | "that", "those" |
| zihita | "frog" |
| zoia | "pot" |
| zysquy | "head" or "skull" |

=== Greetings ===
The following greetings have been taken directly from written sources from the 17th century when the language was alive.

- choâ - Hello, choâ mzone – how are you?
- choâ mibizine - To greet several people.
- chogue – Fine!
- mua, z, choâ umzone – What about you? (And you are well?)
- haspqua sihipquaco – Greetings!

=== Usage today ===
Words of Muysc cubun origin are still used in the department of Cundinamarca, of which Bogotá is the capital, and the department of Boyacá, with capital Tunja. These include curuba (Colombian fruit banana passionfruit), toche (yellow oriole), guadua (a large bamboo used in construction) and tatacoa ("snake"). The Muisca descendants continue many traditional ways, such as the use of certain foods, use of coca for teas and healing rituals, and other aspects of natural ways, which are a respected part of culture in Colombia.

As the Muisca did not have words for imported technology or items in early colonial times, they borrowed them from Spanish, such as "shoe"; çapato, "sword"; espada, "knife"; cuchillo and other words.

== Toponyms ==
Most of the original Muisca names of the villages, rivers and national parks and some of the provinces in the central highlands of the Colombian Andes are kept or slightly altered. Usually the names refer to farmfields (ta), the Moon goddess Chía, her husband Sué, names of caciques, the topography of the region, built enclosures (ca) and animals of the region.

== See also ==
- Quechuan languages
- Spanish conquest of the Chibchan Nations
- Muisca numerals, Muisca calendar

== Bibliography ==
- Adelaar & Muysken (2004). The languages of the Andes. Cambriage University Press.
- Casilimas Rojas, Clara Inés (2005). "Expresión de la modalidad en la lengua uwa" (PDF). Amerindia (in Spanish). 29/30: 247–262.
- Constenla Umaña, Adolfo (1984). "Los fonemas del muisca". Estudios de lingüística chibcha. 3: 65–111.
- Gamboa Mendoza, Jorge (2016). Los muiscas, grupos indígenas del Nuevo Reino de Granada. Una nueva propuesta sobre su organizacíon socio-política y su evolucíon en el siglo XVI [The Muisca, indigenous groups of the New Kingdom of Granada. A new proposal on their social-political organization and their evolution in the 16th century] (video) (in Spanish). Museo del Oro. Archived from the original on 2021-12-13.
- Gamboa Mendoza, Gamboa (2013). El cacicazgo muisca en los años posteriores a la Conquista: del psihipqua al cacique colonial. Instituto Colombiano de Antropología e Historia.
- Gómez, Diego F (2008–2022). "Diccionario muysca – español" (in Spanish). muysca.cubun.org.
- Gómez, Diego F (2013). Comparación léxica entre el muysca de Bogotá y el uwa central. Muysca: memoria y presencia. Bogotá (in Spanish). Universidad Nacional de Colombia.
- Gómez, Diego F (2020). "Los folletos muyscas de la Biblioteca Bodleiana (1603): los textos más tempranos de la lengua general del Nuevo Reino de Granada". Revista internacional de lingüística iberoamericana (in Spanish). 18 (36). Iberoamericana Editorial Vervuert: 195–216. doi:10.31819/rili-2020-183610. S2CID 256616900.
- González de Pérez, María Stella (2006). Aproximación al sistema fonético-fonológico de la lengua muisca (in Spanish). Bogotá Instituto Caro y Cuervo. pp. 53–119.
- Quesada Pacheco, Miguel Ángel; Rojas Chaves, Carmen (1999). Diccionario boruca – español, español – boruca (in Spanish). Universidad de Costa Rica. pp. 1–207. ISBN 9789977675480.
- Reichel-Dolmatoff, Gerardo (1947). "La lengua chimila" [The Chimila language]. Journal de la Société des Américanistes (in Spanish). 36: 15–50. doi:10.3406/jsa.1947.2358.
- Uricoechea, Ezequiel (1854). Memoria sobre las antigüedades neo granadinas (in Spanish). Librería de F. Schneider.
