= San Lorenzo de la Parrilla =

- municipality
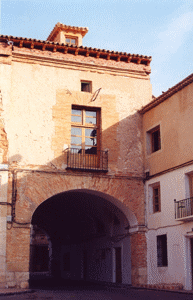

- Flag Coat of arms

- Location within Spain Location within Castilla-La Mancha
- Coordinates: 39°51′N 2°22′W
- Country: Spain
- Autonomous community: Castile-La Mancha
- Province: Cuenca
- Municipality: San Lorenzo de la Parrilla

Area
  - Total: 59.89 km^{2} (23.12 sq mi)
- Elevation: 944 m (3,097 ft)

Population (2025-01-01)
  - Total: 1,119
  - Density: 18.68/km^{2} (48.39/sq mi)
- Time zone: UTC+1 (CET)
  - Summer (DST): UTC+2 (CEST)

San Lorenzo de la Parrilla is a municipality located in the province of Cuenca, Castile-La Mancha, Spain. According to the 2004 census (INE), the municipality had a population of 1,339 inhabitants.
