= Ezequiel Uricoechea =

Colombian Linguist

Dr. Ezequiel Uricoechea
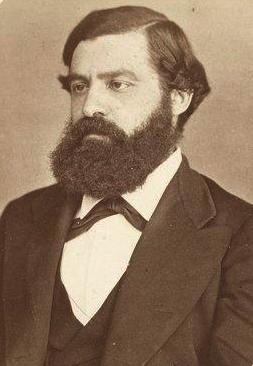
- Photo of Ezequiel Uricoechea
- Born: April 9, 1834; Bogotá, Republic of New Granada
- Died: July 29, 1880 (aged 46); Beirut, Ottoman Empire
- Citizenship: Colombian
- Education: Yale Medical School
- Known for: Linguistics
- Scientific career
- Fields: Spanish and Chibcha linguistics
- Workplaces: University of Göttingen; University of Brussels

Ezequiel Uricoechea Rodríguez (Bogotá, 9 April 1834 – Beirut, 29 July 1880) was a Colombian linguist and scientist. He is considered one of the first Colombian scientists and a pioneer in Spanish-language linguistics.

== Biography ==
Uricoechea was born in Santa Fe de Bogotá in what was then the Republic of New Granada. He graduated from Yale Medical School in 1852. In 1853 he became Doctor of Philosophy at the University of Göttingen, after which he went to Brussels where he assisted Adolphe Quetelet at the Royal Observatory of Belgium. He afterwards visited Paris and London for the purpose of extending his scientific knowledge, and on his return to Bogotá founded a college for the higher branches of science, where he delivered lectures on chemistry, his favorite subject, and the theme of several of his published monographs.

Uricoechea was also an able philologist, and while in Bogotá made many excursions to collect materials for the study of the languages and archaeology of extinct peoples. The revolutions in New Granada caused him to return to Europe, where he had leisure for his favorite researches. While residing in Spain and Morocco, he made such progress in Arabic that when a chair of that language was founded in the University of Brussels, he was assigned as professor. He had only accomplished the work appropriate to his new chair a translation into French of Carl Paul Caspari's Arabic Grammar, when he died of dysentery, in Beirut, then part of the Ottoman Empire, on July 28, 1880. Uricoechea went to Beirut for further study of Arabic in the locality where it was considered to have the purest accent.

He was also the author of various works on the antiquities and native languages of Spanish America, and of a valuable catalogue of the maps relating to the same region.

== Published works ==
- Antigüedades neogranadinas (1854)
- Mapoteca colombiana: colección de los títulos de todos los mapas, planos, vists, etc., relativos a la América española, Brasil e islas adyacentes (1860)
- Lecciones de alemán dictadas por Ezequiel Uricoechea (1860)
- Gramática, vocabulario, catecismo i confesionario de la lengua chibcha según antiguos manuscritos anónimos e inéditos, aumentados i corregidos (1871)
- El alfabeto fonético de la lengua castellana (1872)
- Vocabulario páez-castellano, catecismo, nociones gramaticales i dos pláticas / conforme a lo que escribió el señor Eujenio del Castillo i Orosco cura de Tálaga ; con adiciones, corr. i un vocabulario castellano-páez (1877)
- Apéndice a la gramática, catecismo y vocabulario de la lengua goajira escrita con Rafael Calderón (1878)
- Grammaire Arabe de C.P. Caspani traduite de la quatrième édition allemande et en partie remaniée par E. Uricoechea (1880).

== See also ==
- List of Muisca scholars
- Chibcha language
