= Pedro Simón =

Spanish franciscan friar, professor and chronicler

Fray Pedro Simón
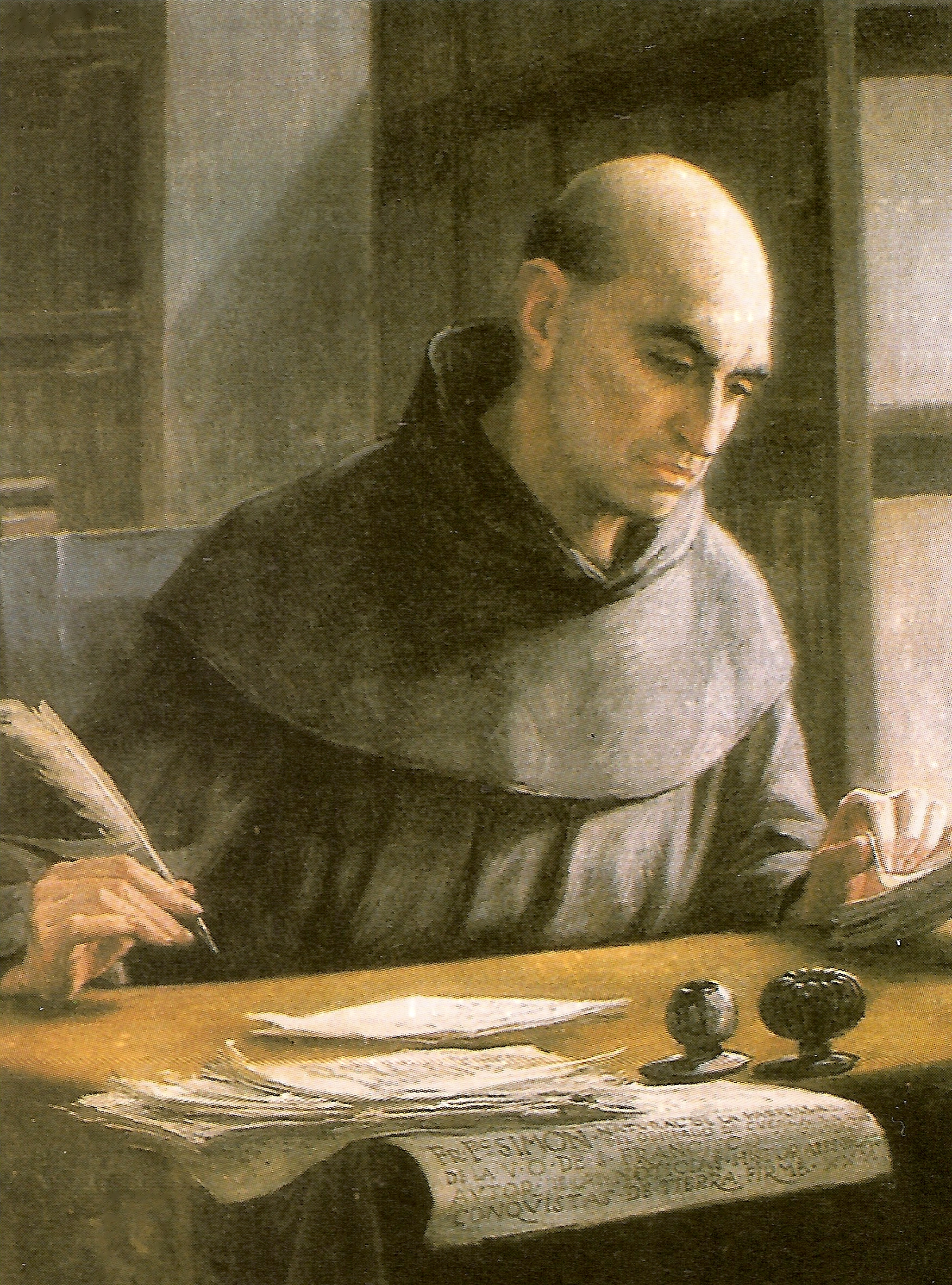
- Painting of Pedro Simón (1941)
- Born: 1574; San Lorenzo de la Parrilla, Spain
- Died: ca. 1628; Ubaté, New Kingdom of Granada
- Writing career
- Language: Spanish
- Subjects: Muisca religion, mythology, History of Colombia and Venezuela
- Notable work: Noticias historiales de las conquistas de Tierra Firme en las Indias occidentales (1626)

Fray Pedro Simón (San Lorenzo de la Parrilla, Spain, 1574 - Ubaté, New Kingdom of Granada, ca. 1628) was a Spanish Franciscan friar, professor and chronicler of the indigenous peoples of modern-day Colombia and Venezuela, at the time forming the New Kingdom of Granada. Pedro Simón is one of the most important Muisca scholars whose writings were the basis for later scholars such as Lucas Fernández de Piedrahita, Alexander von Humboldt, and 21st-century scholar Javier Ocampo López.

== Biography ==
Pedro Simón studied in Cartagena, Spain and went to Cartagena de Indias in 1603. Simón accompanied Juan de Borja and described his war against the Pijao in 1608. On 3 June 1623, he was named Custodio de la Provincia Franciscana del Nuevo Reino de Granada ("custodian of the Franciscan province of the New Kingdom of Granada").

The same year, he began writing his most notable work Noticias historiales de las conquistas de Tierra Firme en las Indias Occidentales, of which the initial section was published in Cuenca, Spain in 1627. The full text appeared for the first time in five volumes in post-independence Bogotá in 1882–1892. Later editions are dated 1953, 1963 and 1982. In the 19th century, one part was published in English translation under the title The Expedition of Pedro de Ursua and Lope de Aguirre (London, 1861). After finishing this work, Simón settled in the San Diego convent in Ubaté, Cundinamarca, where he died sometime between October 1626 and May 7, 1628.

== See also ==
- List of Muisca scholars
- Muisca
