= Languages of Costa Rica =

- Official: Spanish
- Indigenous: Maléku, Cabécar, Bribri, Naso, Guaymí, Buglere
- Foreign: American English, Italian, Haitian Creole, French, Tagalog

Costa Rica's official and predominant language is Spanish. The variety spoken there, Costa Rican Spanish, is a form of Central American Spanish.

Costa Rica is a linguistically diverse country and home to at least five living local indigenous languages spoken by the descendants of pre-Columbian peoples: Maléku, Cabécar, Bribri, Guaymí, and Buglere.

Immigration has also brought people and languages from various countries around the world. Along the Atlantic Ocean in Limón Province, inhabited primarily by Afro-Caribs, an English-based creole language called Mekatelyu or Patua is spoken to varying degrees, as is English; many older Limonenses speak English as their native language. The Quakers community, who settled in Monteverde in the early 1950s, speaks an older dialect of English, using thou instead of you. Costa Rican Sign Language is also spoken by the deaf community, and Costa Rican Spanish slang is known as "pachuco".

Since 2015 Costa Rica is officially known as a multi-ethnic and pluralistic republic. The greatest advance in this respect came with the amendment of Article 76 of the Constitution of Costa Rica, which now states: "Spanish is the official language of the Nation. However, the State will oversee the maintenance and cultivation of indigenous national languages."

== Living indigenous languages ==
Currently, in Costa Rica, there are six indigenous languages that are still used by their respective populations. All of them belonging to the Chibcha language family. Those languages are:

- Maléku language: Also known as Guatuso, spoken by around 800 people in north-eastern Alajuela Province. This language, along with Rama, belongs to the Votic branch of the Chibchan language family.
- Cabécar language: Spoken in the Talamanca mountain range and in the southern Pacific region, Cabécar is the sister language to Bribri in the Isthmic branch of the Chibchan language family.
- Bribri language: Bribri is spoken on the Atlantic slope of the country, including Limón Province, the Talamanca mountain range, and the south Pacífic region. Together with Cabécar, it forms the Viceitic subgroup of Chibchan languages.
- Naso language: Naso is spoken on both the Atlantic slope of the country as well as the south Pacific region. The pacific variety, known as Térraba has a limited number of confirmed living speakers. It is also a member of the Chibchan family.
- Guaymí language: Spoken in various indigenous territories to the southeast of Puntarenas Province, bordering Panama. Together with Buglere, it belongs to the Guaymic subgroup of the Chibchan languages. Also known as Ngäbere or Movere.
- Buglere language: Spoken in the same territories as Guaymí, the language to which it is most closely related. It is also known as Bocotá.

== Extinct and formerly spoken languages ==
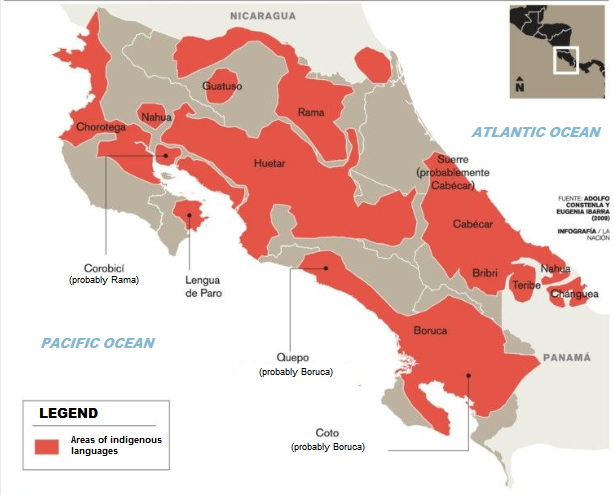
An indigenous language map of Costa Rica, pre-Spanish arrival.

Prior to the 9th century, only languages of the Chibchan family were spoken in Costa Rica. The extinct Huetar language, affiliated with the Chibchan family, served as the lingua franca for the interior of Costa Rica and was considered by the Spanish upon their arrival to be the "general language" of all Costa Rica.

Historically, the range of the still-living Rama language also extended south into northern Costa Rica, where the Maléku language was also spoken. Boruca, an Isthmic Chibchan language, was formerly spoken across the southern Pacific slope while Bribri and Cabécar speakers inhabited the northern Atlantic slope. An unknown language, known only as the lengua de Paro, was also spoken on the western coast of the Gulf of Nicoya.

During the 9th century, speakers of the now-extinct Oto-Manguean language Chorotega controlled most of northeast Costa Rica. Other Mesoamerican peoples penetrated Costa Rican territory.

The Nahua speakers known as Nicarao, named after their cacique of the same name, lived in enclaves in Guanacaste Province as well as near the delta of the Sixaola River, speaking a dialect closer to nuclear Nahuatl in Mexico than to the Pipil of El Salvador and Nicaragua.

At the beginning of the 21st century, Boruca was spoken in the Boruca and Curré reserves in the southeast of Puntarenas province. A few semi-speakers remain in the community.

== European languages ==
According to the Education First international school, Costa Rica ranks highly in English-language proficiency in Central & South America. It is the most widely spoken foreign language, and in addition to being a compulsory subject in school it is the most common foreign language exam taken for entry into tertiary education

This language also has the support and promotion of dozens of cultural institutions founded by one of the most important English-speaking communities in Central America and made up of more than: 20,000 Americans, 10,000 Canadians, 6,000 British and their descendants living in the country, who use the language on a daily basis in parallel with Spanish.

Also noteworthy is the fact that in the northwestern region of the Province of Puntarenas, in the communities of Monteverde and Santa Elena, Quakers speak the typical English of their community, using "thou" instead of "you" and other characteristics typical of the Quaker dialect. In addition, in many other parts of the country there are Mennonite communities from the United States, where English is also used by the population..

One of the largest German communities in Central America is present in the country, with more than 2,000 Germans currently living in Costa Rica. Not counting almost 2000 Swiss, 2000 Mennonites of predominantly German descent and more than 600 Austrians, making up a large German-Costa Rican community that practices and promotes the use of the German language in the nation.

Also noteworthy is the great German migration that took place in Costa Rica during the 19th and 20th centuries, 22 inheriting the country a rich sociocultural and economic contribution. Currently, thousands of Costa Ricans are descendants of these migrants and the Goethe Institut has founded dozens of cultural institutions and even educational centers such as the Humbolt Schule and churches that promote the spread of German in the country.

In addition, in the north of the country, in the Huetar North Region, in Sarapiquí and in San Carlos there are communities founded, colonized or populated by German and Mennonite migrants where their descendants still use German or use a dialect from Old German called Plautdeutsch.

Costa Rica has the largest Italian community in Central America, with more than 2,500 Italians living in the country. In addition, almost 2,000 Swiss also reside in Costa Rica. This, and the many descendants of the Italian migratory flows of the 19th century, create a large Italian-speaking community with institutions and cultural alliances, such as the Dante Alighieri Institute, that promote the teaching of the Italian language.

In addition, in the San Vito area and other communities in the southeast of the nation, Italian is spoken, due to the Italian agricultural colonization that took place in these areas and was promoted by the government. Currently, it is also spoken a dialect resulting from Hispanic influence on the descendants of Italian migrants and Italian is taught as a compulsory subject in regional public education.

In the country, one of the most promoted and popular foreign languages is French. It is noteworthy that Costa Rica has the largest French-speaking community in Central America, being the only Central American country that is an observer Member of the International Organization of La Francophonie, and with more than: 2,000 French, 10,000 Canadians, 2,000 Swiss, and 200 Haitians. In addition, during the nineteenth century the largest migratory flow of French in Central America was registered, directed towards Costa Rica, which has contributed a large number of French-speaking descendants to the country and has produced the creation of many institutions and cultural alliances and even a school that carry out a great promotion and dissemination of French learning in the population. Also, French is a compulsory subject taught in many schools and in the Third Cycle of Basic Education, it is taught in countless schools and can be chosen as a subject to take the baccalaureate exam.

== Asian languages ==
In the 19th century, important groups of Chinese emigrated to Costa Rica and settled mainly in the provinces of Limón, Puntarenas, and Guanacaste, preserving their language, Mandarin or Cantonese, depending on their origin. Currently, there is a constant migratory flow of Chinese and their descendants, who settled in the country use their language on a daily basis, living in Costa Rica about 45,000 Chinese and representing one of the largest Chinese communities in Central America.

In this way, several cultural and even religious institutions and alliances have been created that promote Chinese culture and the spread of the Chinese language in the country. Also, it highlights the large number of educational centers that teach Mandarin as a compulsory subject.

Another language with a notable presence is Arabic, used by more than 200 Lebanese, 200 Emiratis, and a large number of Lebanese, Arab and 19th century immigrants from the Middle East who live in the country. Furthermore, Costa Rica has one of the largest Muslim communities in Central America, which uses this language as its liturgical language. There are dozens of cultural institutions in the nation that spread the Arabic language and culture, such as the Lebanese House.

The Hebrew language is also used as a liturgical language by the Jewish Costa Rican community, one of the largest in Central America, and it is also used by more than 1000 Israelis and their descendants who live in the country. This language is also promoted by Zionist institutes present in the nation. The large number of Jews living in Costa Rica derives from isolated migratory processes, such as the great Polish immigration or the entry of many Sephardic and Ashkenazi Jews to the territory, bringing with it the use of Hebrew as a religious language.
