= Bribri language =

Chibchan language of southeast Costa Rica

Bribri
- Talamanca
- Su Uhtuk
- Native to: Costa Rica
- Region: Limón province: Talamanca cantón, along Lari, Telire, and Uren rivers Puntarenas province: Buenas Aires cantón
- Ethnicity: 12,200 Bribri (2000)
- Native speakers: 7,000 (2011)
- Language family: Chibchan: Isthmic; Talamanca; Viceitic; Bribri
- Dialects: Coroma; Amubre; Salitre

Official status
- Recognised minority language in: Costa Rica

Language codes
- ISO 639-3: bzd
- Glottolog: brib1243
- ELP: Bribri
- Linguasphere: 81-EBB-ba
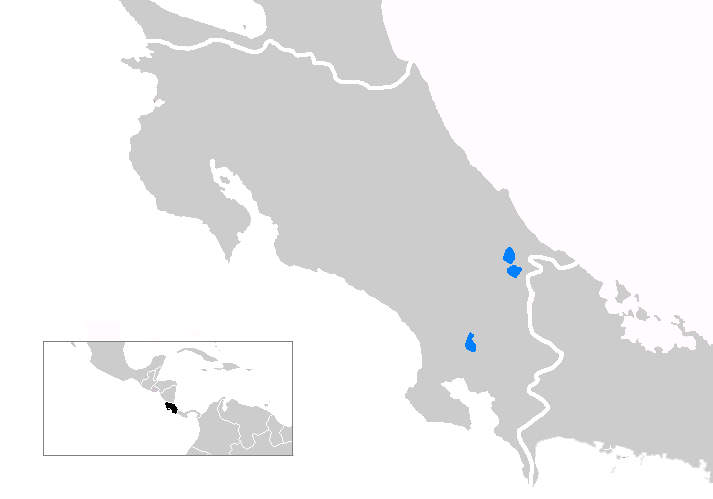

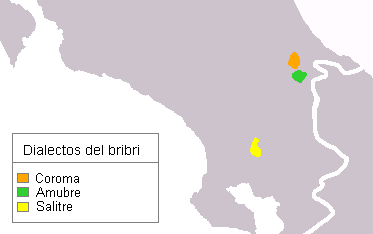
Map showing dialects of Bribri

Bribri, also known as Bri-bri, Bribriwak, and Bribri-wak, is a Chibchan language, from a language family indigenous to the Isthmo-Colombian Area, which extends from eastern Honduras to northern Colombia and includes populations of those countries as well as Nicaragua, Costa Rica, and Panama. As of 2002, there were about 11,000 speakers left. An estimate by the National Census of Costa Rica in 2011 found that Bribri is currently spoken by 54.7% of the 12,785 Bribri people, about 7,000 individuals. It is a tonal language whose word order is subject–object–verb.

There are three traditional dialects of Bribri: Coroma (in the western region of the Talamanca mountain range), Amubre (in the eastern region of the Talamanca mountain range) and Salitre (in the South Pacific area). Bribri is a tribal name, deriving from a word for 'mountainous' in their own language. The Bribri language is also referred to as Su Uhtuk, which means 'our language'. Bribri is reportedly most similar to sister language Cabécar as both languages have nasal harmony, but they are mutually unintelligible.

== Phonology ==
=== Consonants ===
Bribri consonant inventory
		Bilabial	Alveolar	Postalveolar ~Palatal	Velar	Glottal
Occlusive	Voiced	b~m	d~n	ɟ~ɲ		
Occlusive	Short	p	t		k	ʔ
Occlusive	Long	pː	tː	t͜kʲ	kː	
Affricate	Short		t͜s	t͜ʃ		
Affricate	Long		t͜ːs	t͜ːʃ		
Fricative			s	ʃ		h
Rhotic			ɾ~n			
Glide		w		j		

- /b/ has allophones [b, β, m], the last when next to nasal vowels.
- /d/ has allophones [d, ɽ, ɽ̃, n].
- /ɟ/ has allophones [ɟ, ɲ].
- /ɾ/ has allophones [ɾ, r, n].
- /w, j/ have nasalized allophones [w̃, j̃].
- /t͜ʃ/ has the allophones [t͜ʃ, tʲ, c].
- Long consonants are realized by some speakers as pre-aspirated rather than geminate. They may not be separated by vowels, unlike consonant sequences.
- /t͜kʲ/ has allophones [kʲ, t͜ʃ] at the beginning of a word, [t̚, tː] at the end, and [t̚kʲ, kːʲ, ʰkʲ, t͜ːʃ, ʰt͜ʃ] in the middle. It is distinct from the sequence /tk/ and appears to be merging into /t͜ːʃ/; in Coroma dialect it apparently already has.
- /h/ is only found in Coroma dialect.

All voiced consonants have nasal allophones in the environment of (before or after) nasal vowels. In the case of /d/, flapped allophones occur initially before a consonant, and medially between vowels. Occlusive [d, n] only occur initially before a vowel.

Long and short consonants contrast medially and word-finally.

=== Vowels ===
I, u and a are pronounced in the same manner as they would be in Spanish. E and o are more open than in Spanish. The sound of ë is between i and e, and ö is between u and o. The nasal vowels are pronounced similarly to the corresponding orals, with the addition of some air exiting through the nose.

In Coroma dialect, ã has merged into /ɔ̃/, and an initial unaccented vowel /a/ or /ã/ tends to be dropped.

Bribri vowel inventory
		Front	Central	Back
High	oral	i		u
High	nasal	ĩ		ũ
Near-high		ɪ ⟨ë⟩		ʊ ⟨ö⟩
Mid-low	oral	ɛ		ɔ
Mid-low	nasal	ɛ̃		ɔ̃
Low	oral		a	
Low	nasal		ã	

Spanish examples of oral vowels:
yì ¿quién?		ù casa
yë padre, papá		tö sí
yeꞌ yo		só cucaracha
	awá médico	

Spanish examples of nasal vowels:
mĩ madre, mamá		ũ olla
sẽ eso, ese		mõ nube
	ã en; para	

=== Pitch accent ===
In stressed or 'accented' syllables, Bribri distinguishes high (allophonically rising) and falling tones; unstressed syllables do not distinguish tone and tend to have low pitch. There are past reports that high and rising tone are contrastive in Amubre dialect, for a three-way distinction in accented syllables; however, this was not confirmed with more recent investigations.

=== Syllable structure ===
The final syllable of a root is accented (tonic) and is maximally CVC. All syllables but the last are unaccented and maximally CV̆; the vowel is short and may only be /a i u/ or their nasal counterparts. The vowels in such syllables may be elided, producing phonetic consonant sequences.

== Alphabet ==
The Linguistics Department at the University of Costa Rica has conceived a standardized spelling system that is based on several earlier attempts.

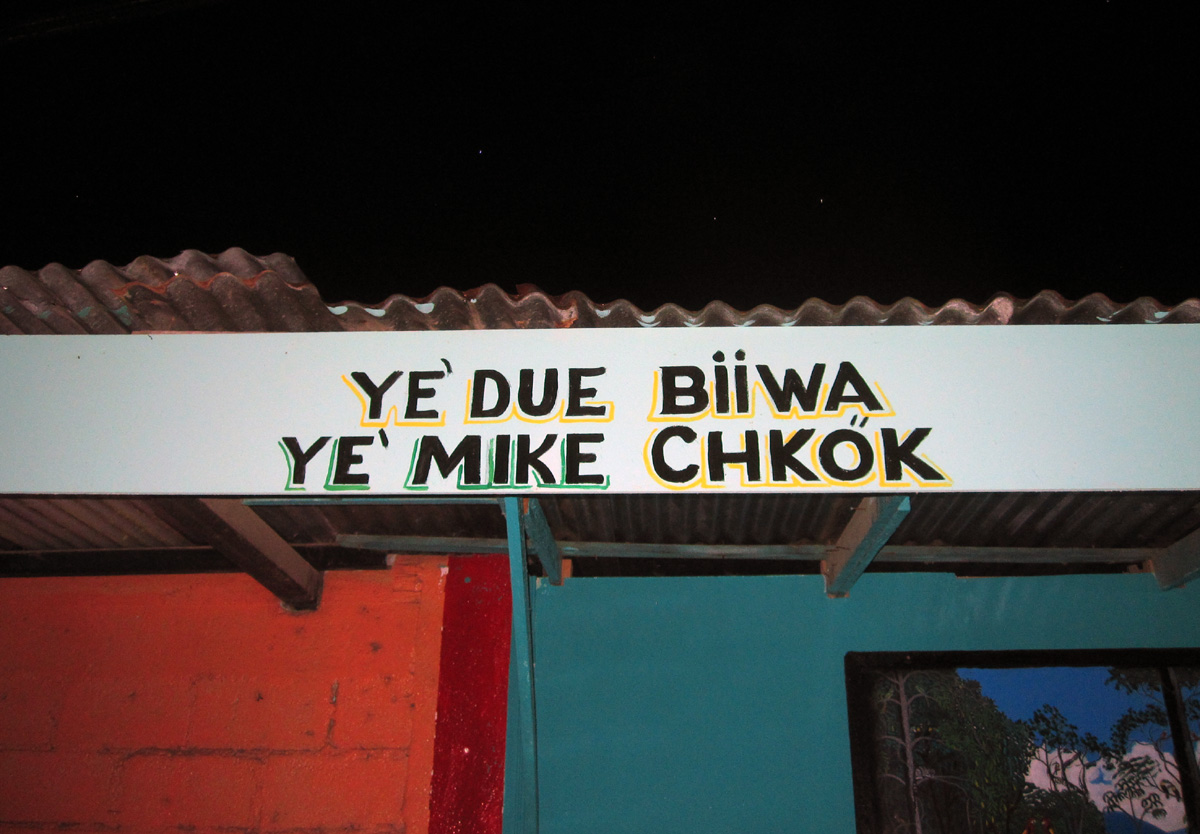
Bribri sign in a restaurant in Bribrí in Talamanca, Costa Rica. Translation: "I'm hungry, I'm going to eat."

Majuscule forms (also called uppercase or capital letters)
A	B	D	Ch	E	Ë	I	J	K	L	M	N	Ñ	O	Ö	P	Pp	R	Rr	S	Sh	T	Tt	Tch	Tk	Ts	U	W	Y	ꞌ
Minuscule forms (also called lowercase or small letters)
a	b	d	ch	e	ë	i	j	k	l	m	n	ñ	o	ö	p	pp	r	rr	s	sh	t	tt	tch	tk	ts	u	w	y	ꞌ
Value
a	b	d	tʃ	e	ɪ	i, j	h	k	ɽ	m	n	ɲ	o	ʊ	p	pː	ɾ	r	s	ʃ	t	tː	tːʃ	tk	ts	u	w	ɟ	ʔ

Nasal vowels are indicated by a tilde: ⟨ã, ẽ, ĩ, õ, ũ⟩ (Previously indicated with a macron below: a̱, e̱, i̱, o̱, u̱), except after a nasal consonant (already indicating nasalisation of the vowel).

Tone is indicated by the grave accent for the high/rising tone and the acute accent for the falling tone. Unaccented syllables are not marked.

== See also ==
- Bribri Sign Language

== Bibliography ==
- Constenla Umaña, Adolfo; Feliciano Elizondo Figueroa; Francisco Pereira Mora (1998). Curso básico de bribri. San José, Costa Rica: Editorial de la Universidad de Costa Rica.
- Constenla Umaña, Adolfo (1991). Las lenguas del área intermedia: Introducción a su estudio areal. San José, Costa Rica: Editorial de la Universidad de Costa Rica.
- Constenla Umaña, Adolfo (2008). "Estado actual de la subclasificación de las lenguas chibchenses y de la reconstrucción fonológica y gramatical del protochibchense". Estudios de Lingüística Chibcha. 27. San José, Costa Rica: 117–135.
- García Miguel; José María (1999). "La expresión de actantes centrales en español (romance) y bribri (chibcha): tipología, discurso y cognición" (PDF). Actas do 1º Encontro de Lingüística Cognitiva. Faculdade de Letras do Porto: 101–121.
- Jara Murillo; Carla Victoria (1993). I ttè. Historias bribris. San José, Costa Rica: Editorial de la Universidad de Costa Rica.
- Jara Murillo; Carla Victoria (2013). "Morfología verbal de la lengua bribri". Estudios de Lingüística Chibcha. 32. San José, Costa Rica: 95–152.
- Jara Murillo; Carla Victoria; Alí García Segura (1997). Kó késka. El lugar del tiempo. San José, Costa Rica: Editorial de la Universidad de Costa Rica.
- Jara Murillo; Carla Victoria; Alí García Segura (2009). Seꞌ ẽꞌ yawö bribri wa. Aprendemos la lengua bribri. San José, Costa Rica: Universidad de Costa Rica – UNICEF.
- Jara Murillo; Carla Victoria; Alí García Segura (2013). Seꞌ ttö́ bribri ie. Hablemos en bribri. San José, Costa Rica: E-Digital.
- Krohn, Haakon Stensrud (2014). "Semántica de los clasificadores numerales en el bribri de Coroma". Estudios de Lingüística Chibcha. 33. San José, Costa Rica: 209–239.
- Margery Peña, Enrique (1982). Diccionario fraseológico bribri–español español–bribri. San José, Costa Rica: Editorial de la Universidad de Costa Rica.
- Quesada, J. Diego (2007). The Chibchan languages. Cartago, Costa Rica: Editorial Tecnológica de Costa Rica.
- Sánchez Avendaño, Carlos (2009). "La voz media en bribri y la hipótesis de la elaboración relativa de los eventos". Estudios de Lingüística Chibcha. 28. San José, Costa Rica: 47–73.
- Tohsaku, Y.-H. (1987). "Bribri nasal harmony from the vantage point of the universal theory of harmony". Working Papers of the Linguistic Circle of the University of Victoria. 6 (1): 1–10.
