= Adolfo Constenla Umaña =

Costa Rican linguist

- Born: Adolfo Constenla Umaña; January 14, 1948; San José, Costa Rica
- Died: November 7, 2013 (aged 65); Costa Rica
- Occupation: Linguist

Academic work
- Institutions: University of Costa Rica
- Main interests: Chibchan languages

Adolfo Constenla Umaña (January 14, 1948, in San José, Costa Rica – November 7, 2013) was a Costa Rican philologist and linguist who specialized in the indigenous languages of Central America. He is especially known as a leading scholar on Chibchan languages, and some sources referred to him as the "father of Chibchan linguistics."

== Education ==
He studied Spanish philology at the University of Costa Rica. In 1981, he graduated with a Ph.D. in Linguistics from the University of Pennsylvania with a thesis on the comparative phonology of the Chibchan languages.

== Career ==
Beginning in 1970, he worked as a teacher and researcher at the School of Philology, Linguistics, and Literature at the University of Costa Rica. He was promoted to Professor in 1983.

In 1969 Constenla began a life-long working relationship when, at the recommendation of Arturo Agüero, he visited the Malecu (Guatuso) people of northern Costa Rica. He would study and publish extensively about their language Maleku Lhaíca (also known in Spanish as Guatuso), for the rest of his life:

"Porque cuando yo iba a hacer mi tesis de licenciatura, quería hacerla sobre una lengua indígena. Y me dijo Don Arturo Agüero, que era el director de la escuela de filología en esa época, que el Guatuso era la lengua que menos se había investigado, y que hiciera mi tesis sobre ella. Y entonces, verdad? Me fui en el año sesenta y nueve por primera vez." (When I was about to do my licentiate thesis, I wanted it to be about an indigenous language. And Arturo Agüero, who was then the directory of the School of Philology, told me that Maleku was the least studied [among Costa Rican] languages, and that I should write my thesis about it. And so, I went [to the Maleku] in the following year, 1969.)

His work was by no means limited to Maléku, however. By his own accounting, he lists the languages he worked on most as:

The languages I have worked with the most are, well, I started with [Maléku]. This was the focus of my undergraduate thesis. After that, I continued with Boruca … the first book I published was on Boruca. Then I worked on Bribri as well. Some of my first publications, around the same time, were also on Bribri. I also did a lot of work on Térraba. I have done some work, though not much, on Guaymí and Cabécar. Las lenguas con las que más he trabajado son, bueno, comencé con [malécu]. Esta fue el tema de mi tesis de licenciatura. Después seguí con el boruca … mi primer libro que publiqué fue sobre boruca. Luego trabajé en bribri también. Algunas de mis primeras publicaciones, más o menos en la misma época, fueron sobre bribri. También trabajé mucho en térraba. He trabajado un poco en guaymí y cabécar, pero no demasiado.

Constenla was the founder and coordinator of the Programa de Investigaciones sobre las Lenguas de Costa Rica y Áreas Vecinas (PIL; "Research Program on the Languages of Costa Rica and Neighboring Areas"). From 1985 to 1996, he collected and analyzed linguistic data of many indigenous Central America languages. He published a full-length grammar of Maleku in 1998

From 1988–1989, he was a visiting professor at the State University of New York at Albany. In 1995, he became a full member of the Academia Costarricense de la Lengua.

He advised (as of 2011) 22 degrees, 9 Masters and 12 Licentiate, mostly regarding indigenous languages of Costa Rica and Central America.

For his work, Constenla received the Aquileo J. Echeverría National Award three times, in 1979, 1998, and 2007. In addition, he received the Carlos Gagini Award from the Costa Rican Association of Philology and Linguistics in 1984.

He died from cancer on November 7, 2013, at the age of 65.
