= Maléku =

Maleku may refer to:

- the Maleku people
- the Maleku language
