= Naso language (disambiguation) =

Naso may be,

- Nasö language, China
- Teribe language, Panama
