= Huetar =

Huetar may be,

- Huetar language
- a historical region of Costa Rica named after the Huetars
