= Miguel Ángel Quesada Pacheco =

Costa Rican linguist

Miguel Ángel Quesada
- Born: Miguel Ángel Quesada Pacheco; 6 May 1955 (age 70); San José, Costa Rica
- Occupations: Linguist and University professor
- Employer: University of Costa Rica

Miguel Ángel Quesada Pacheco (San José, 6 May 1955) is a Costa Rican linguist and professor. His areas of research include the dialectology of Central American Spanish, the history of the Spanish language in Costa Rica and the documentation of Central America's indigenous languages, with a special focus on the Chibchan languages.

== Education and career ==
In 1971 he began to study Spanish philology at the University of Costa Rica (UCR), where he studied under the linguist Gastón Gaínza. Later, he obtained a doctorate in Romance philology, Germanic philology and Comparative linguistics at the University of Cologne (1986), where he graduated with a thesis about the colonial Spanish of Costa Rica. Some time later, he became a professor and researcher at the UCR and the University of Bergen. In 2000 he became an academic of the Academia Costarricense de la Lengua (ACL), occupying the seat R.

In the UCR he held a professorship in Spanish philology in the School of Philology, Linguistics and Literature and was a researcher at the Institute of Linguistic Research.

As a member of the ACL, he has participated regularly in the Permanent Commission of the Association of Academies of the Spanish Language (ASALE) (2000, 2010 y 2016), as well as in various editions of the Congress of the Association of Academies of the Spanish Language (2001, 2007, 2010, 2013) and of the International Conference of the Spanish Language, organized by the Instituto Cervantes, the Real Academia Española and the ASALE.

== Work ==
Quesada Pacheco's research has focused principally on the study of languages spoken in Central America, such as Central American Spanish, with special emphasis on its Costa Rican variety, and various Chibchan languages.

Quesada Pacheco's work on Costa Rican Spanish is rooted in dialectology and historical linguistics. He has investigated the development of Costa Rican Spanish since the colonial era. Between the years 1992-2010 he worked on the Atlas lingüístico-etnográfico de Costa Rica (ALECORI) project, the first of its kind for Costa Rican Spanish.

He later applied his experience with the ALECORI to the Atlas lingüítico-etnográfico de América Central, which aimed at systematically studying the Spanish of Central America by way of dialect surveys. This work cleared the way for the publication of various national linguistic atlases prepared by his students on the Spanish varieties of Belize, Guatemala, Honduras, El Salvador, Nicaragua and Panama.

As for his work with Amerindian languages, Quesada Pacheco has worked extensively on the description of Boruca, Guaymí, Cabécar, Huetar, Chibcha and Pech. His ethnolinguistic studies on the Huetar people and language earned Quesada Pacheco the Premio Nacional Aquileo J. Echeverría en 1997.

== Awards and recognitions ==
Quesada Pacheco has received the Premio Nacional Aquileo J. Echeverría on two occasions (1997, 2009), the Premio Magón (2015) and the Norwegian Association of Researchers' Research Award (2015).
