= Isthmic Chibchan =

Branch of Chibchan languages

Isthmic
- Geographic distribution: Nicaragua, Costa Rica, Panama, Colombia and Venezuela
- Linguistic classification: Chibchan: Isthmic
- Subdivisions: Talamanca; Guaymí–Guna; Doracic

Language codes
- ISO 639-3: None (mis)
- Glottolog: isth1243

The Isthmic languages are a branch of the Chibchan languages that includes the most speakers of the language family; they are spoken in Nicaragua, Costa Rica, Panama, Colombia and Venezuela.

== Definition ==
Costa Rican linguist specializing in Chibchan languages Adolfo Constenla Umaña identifies several phonological and grammatical characteristics that distinguish the Isthmic languages from other Chibchan languages.

== Classification ==
The Isthmic languages are subdivided into three groups: the Western Isthmic/Talamanca languages, the Doracic languages, and the Eastern Isthmic/Guaymí–Guna languages.

=== Western Isthmic/Talamanca languages ===
Talamanca
- Western Isthmic
- Geographic distribution: Costa Rica, Panama
- Linguistic classification: Chibchan: Isthmic; Talamanca
- Subdivisions: Boruca†; Naso; Viceitic

Language codes
- ISO 639-3: None (mis)
- Glottolog: west2641

The Western Isthmic languages are spoken in Costa Rica and northern Panama. They are Boruca, an extinct language that was spoken in the canton of Buenos Aires in Costa Rica;, Bribri, spoken in the cantons of Buenos Aires and Talamanca in Costa Rica;, Cabécar, spoken in the canton of Talamanca in Costa Rica;, and Teribe, spoken in the south of Puntarenas Province in Costa Rica and in the north of Bocas del Toro Province in Panama.

The similarities between Bribri and Cabécar justify grouping them together within a common subgroup, the Viceitic languages.

=== Doracic languages ===
Doracic
- Geographic distribution: Costa Rica, Panama
- Linguistic classification: Chibchan: Isthmic; Doracic
- Subdivisions: Changuena†; Dorasque†

Language codes
- ISO 639-3: None (mis)
- Glottolog: dora1241

The Doracic languages were spoken in northern Panama, near the Costa Rican border. The two known representatives of this group are the extinct languages Changuena; and Dorasque

=== Eastern Isthmic/Guaymí–Guna languages ===
Guaymí–Guna
- Eastern Isthmic
- Geographic distribution: Costa Rica, Panama, Colombia
- Linguistic classification: Chibchan: Isthmic; Guaymí–Guna
- Subdivisions: Guaymí; Guna

Language codes
- ISO 639-3: None (mis)
- Glottolog: east2569

The Eastern Isthmic languages are spoken in Panama and Colombia. They are Buglere, spoken in Panama;, Ngäbere, spoken in the Ngäbe-Buglé Comarca in Panama and in southern Costa Rica, near the Panamanian border;, and Guna, spoken in Panama and Colombia.

The similarities between Buglere and Ngäbere justify grouping them together within a common subgroup, the Guaymi languages.

== Lexical Comparison ==
The numerals in different Isthmic varieties are:

| Glossary | Western | | | | Eastern | | | Proto-Isthmic |
| Glossary | Boruca | Bribri | Cabécar | Teribe | Buglere | Ngäbere | Guna | Proto-Isthmic |
|---|---|---|---|---|---|---|---|---|
| 1 | éʔtsè | éköl | é- | kʰwara | gdɑite | di | gwen | *e-kwə |
| 2 | búʔk | bö́l | bó- | pʰo̘k̚ | gdɑboke | bu | bo | *boke |
| 3 | máŋ | mañál | bāʤã́- | mya | gdɑmɑ̃ĩ | mɔ | baa | *bayã |
| 4 | báxkàŋ | tkë́l | pkí-(N.) tkí-(S.) | pkɪŋ | gdɑbɑgɑ | bgɔ | bake | *bake |
| 5 | ʃɪʃkáŋ | ské̠l | skẽ́- | ʃkɪŋ | gdɑtigɑ | rigɛ | atar | *tig(?) (*skẽ-) |
| 6 | téʃàŋ | teröl | sàhurà+1 | tʰɛr | gdɑdereke | ti | nergwa | *ter- |
| 7 | kúx | kúl | sàhurà+2 | kʰɔ̘k̚ | gdɑguke | kɯɡɯ | gugle | *gug(l)e |
| 8 | éxtàŋ kúxtàŋ | pàköl | sàhurà+3 | kʰwoŋ | gdɑpɑ | kwɔ | baabak | *kwog-(?) |
| 9 | éxkùx | su̠lì̠tu | sàhurà+4 | ʃkaw | gdɑĩnkɑ | ɤɡɔ̃ | bakebak | ? |
| 10 | téxkùx | dabam | sàhurà bótkʊ̀ | sakwara | gdɑtɑboko | ni hɔdɔ | ambe | *taba(?) |

== Bibliography ==
- Constenla Umaña, Adolfo (2012). "Chibchan language". In Campbell, Lyle; Grondona, Veronica (eds.). The Indigenous Languages of South America: A Comprehensive Guide. Berlin, Boston: De Gruyter Brill. pp. 391–439. ISBN 978-3-11-025513-3..
- Natacha, Chevrier (2017). Analyse de la phonologie du bribri (chibcha) dans une perspective typologique: nasalité et géminée modulée. Lyon: University of Lyon..
- Constenla Umaña, Adolfo. 1981. Comparative Chibchan Phonology. (Ph.D. dissertation, Department of Linguistics, University of Pennsylvania, Philadelphia). "Enllaç". Archived from the original on September 2, 2006.
- Constenla Umaña, Adolfo (1991). Las lenguas del Área Intermedia: Introducción a su estudio areal. San José, C.R.: Editorial de la University of Costa Rica.
- Constenla Umaña, Adolfo (1995). "Sobre el estudio diacrónico de las lenguas chibchenses y su contribución al conocimiento del pasado de sus hablantes". Boletín del Museo del Oro (38–39): 13–56. Archived from the original on 2009-09-09.
- Constenla Umaña, Adolfo (2002). "Acerca de la relación genealógica entre las lenguas lencas y las lenguas misumalpas" (PDF). Revista de Filología y Lingüística de la Universidad de Costa Rica (28): 189–206.
- Constenla Umaña, Adolfo (2005). "¿Existe relación genealógica entre las lenguas misumalpas y las chibchenses?". Estudios de Lingüística Chibcha (24): 7–85.
- Constenla Umaña, Adolfo (2008). "Estado actual de la subclasificación de las lenguas chibchenses y de la reconstrucción fonológica y gramatical del protochibchense". Estudios de Lingüística Chibcha (27): 117–135.
