= Chibcha language (disambiguation) =

Chibcha can refer to:

- Chibcha language: It is also known as "Muysc cubun" (the language of the Muisca)
- Chibchan languages: A language family with many other languages related from Central America to the north of South America

Note

Muisca may refer to the Muisca Confederation of tribes that lasted until the Spanish conquest of the Muisca in the first half of the 16th century
