= Pitao (disambiguation) =

Pitao is a common name for Pitavia punctata, a species of plant.

Pitao may also refer to:

- Pitāo, a ridge in Pakistan
- Pitao, part of the name of multiple gods in the traditional Zapotec religion, including:
  - Pitao Cocijo, the god of lightening
  - Pitao Cozobi, the primary god of maize and agriculture
  - Pitao Xicala, the god of love, dreams, and excess'

== See also ==
- Pito
- Titao
