= Isthmo-Colombian Area =

Historical cultural area in the Americas

The Isthmo-Colombian Area is defined as a cultural area encompassing those territories occupied predominantly by speakers of the Misumalpan and Chibchan languages at the time of European contact. It includes portions of the Central American isthmus like eastern Honduras, the Mosquitia region, Panama, and northern Colombia.

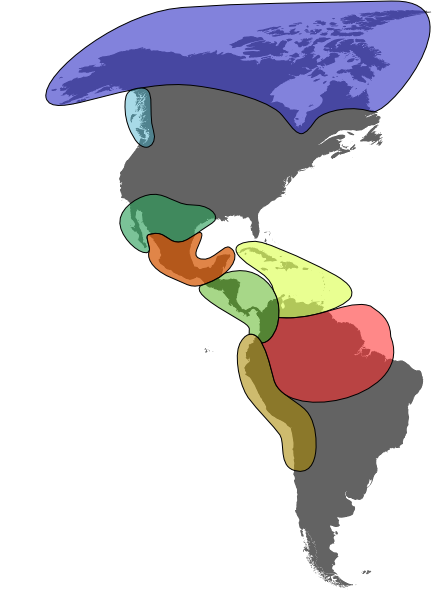
Major cultural areas of the pre-Columbian Americas: Arctic Northwest Aridoamerica Mesoamerica Isthmo-Colombian Caribbean Amazon Andes

== Cultural area study and theory ==
It is a portion of what has previously been termed the Intermediate Area, and was defined in a chapter by John W. Hoopes and Oscar Fonseca Z in the 2003 book Gold and Power in Ancient Costa Rica, Panama, and Colombia.

The concept draws upon multidisciplinary perspectives, including linguistic reconstructions by Costa Rican anthropological linguist Adolfo Constenla Umaña and observations on Chibchan genetics by Costa Rican anthropological geneticist Ramiro Barrantes Mesén. It is currently being refined through ongoing studies of the linguistics. genetics, archaeology, art history, ethnography, and ethnohistory of this part of the Americas. This includes more recent study of the relationships between this area and the Antilles within a Pan-Caribbean framework.

== Cultural area archaeology ==
Archaeological knowledge of this area has received relatively little attention compared to its adjoining neighbors to the north and south, despite the fact that scholars such as Max Uhle, William Henry Holmes, C. V. Hartman, and George Grant MacCurdy undertook studies of archaeological sites and collections here over a century ago that were augmented by further research by Samuel Kirkland Lothrop, John Alden Mason, Doris Zemurray Stone, William Duncan Strong, Gordon Willey, and others in the early 20th century. One of the reasons for the relative lack of attention is the lack of research by locals themselves into the ancestral monuments and architecture characteristic of communities such as those found in the neighboring culture areas of Mesoamerica and the Andes areas, and a long history of Eurocentric perceptions by Western scholars of what represented civilization.

== Sites and landmarks ==
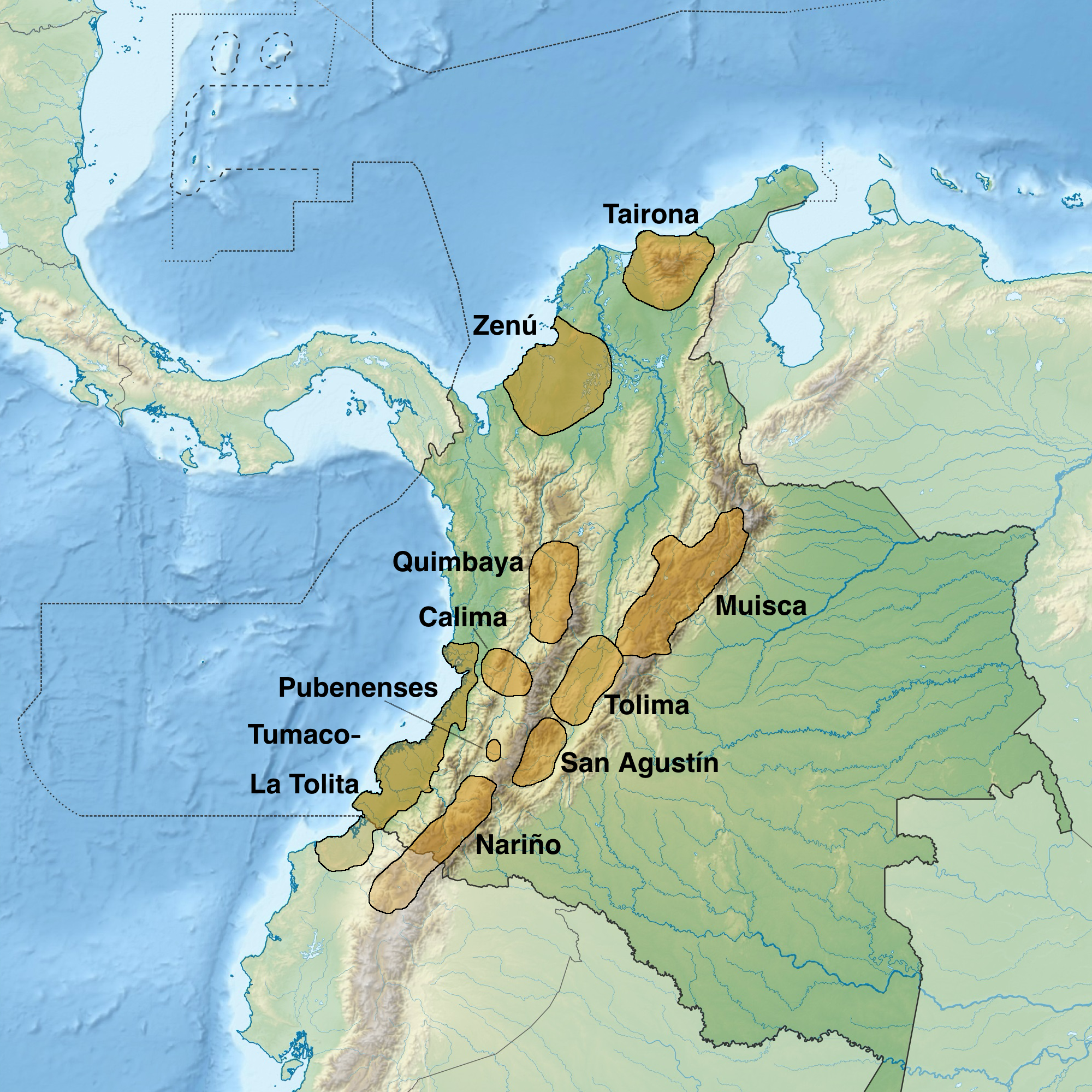
Location map of the pre-Columbian cultures of Colombia

There are a large number of sites with impressive platform mounds, plazas, paved roads, stone sculpture, and artifacts made from jade, gold, and ceramic materials. These include Las Mercedes, Guayabo de Turrialba, Cutrís, and Cubujuquí in Costa Rica and Pueblito (in Tayrona National Natural Park) and Ciudad Perdida in the Sierra Nevada de Santa Marta of Colombia. Research at sites such as Rivas, Costa Rica helps to document the configurations of large settlements in the centuries prior to the Spanish Conquest. Some of the best-known Isthmo-Colombian sculptures are the stone spheres of Costa Rica. Another area that has provided valuable archaeological information is the Gran Coclé region in Panama, largely coinciding with the modern-day Coclé Province.

== Indigenous peoples ==
The Isthmo-Colombian Area was and is still home to a wide variety of indigenous peoples. A large number of them were speakers of Chibchan languages. These include (but are not limited to) the Pech, the Rama, the Maleku, the Bribri, the Cabécar, the Guaymí, the Naso, the Guna, the Kogi, the Motilon, the U'wa, and the Muisca.

Non-Chibchan groupings include Misumalpan languages, Choco languages, Lencan languages (also considered Mesoamerican), and certain Cariban languages.

== See also ==
- Costa Rican jade tradition
- Intermediate Area
