= Tairona language =

Extinct Chibchan language

Tairona
- Native to: Colombia
- Ethnicity: Tairona
- Extinct: (date missing) evolved into Damana
- Language family: Chibchan: Arhuacan; Tairona

Language codes
- ISO 639-3: None (mis)
- Glottolog: None

Tairona is an extinct Chibchan language of Colombia, part of the Arhuacan subgroup, ancestral to the modern-day Damana language and formerly spoken by the Tairona. It is reportedly used by the Kogi people as a ritual language. It has also been proposed to be of other linguistic affiliations.
