= Uwa language =

Chibchan language spoken in Colombia

Uwa
- Tunebo
- Uw Cuwa
- Native to: Colombia, formerly in Venezuela
- Region: the largest groups live on the northern slopes of the Sierra Nevada del Cocuy, Boyacá Department
- Ethnicity: U'wa
- Native speakers: (3,550 cited 2000)
- Language family: Chibchan: Chibcha–Motilon; Chibcha–Tunebo; Uwa

Language codes
- ISO 639-3: Variously: tnd – Angosturas Tunebo/Bahiyakuwa tbn – Barro Negro Tunebo (Eastern Tunebo/Yithkaya) tuf – Central Tunebo (Cobaría/Kubaru'wa & Tegría/Tagrinuwa) tnb – Western Tunebo (Aguas Blancas/Rikuwa)
- Glottolog: tune1260
- ELP: Tunebo
- Linguasphere: 81-EFA-aa
- 81-EFA-b
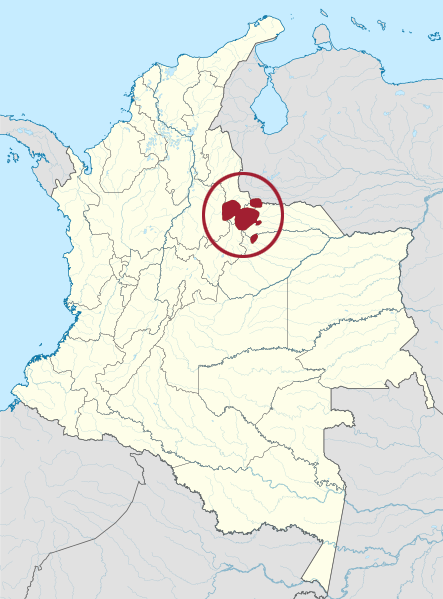

The Uwa language, Uw Cuwa, commonly known as Tunebo, is a Chibchan language spoken by between 1,800 and 3,600 of the Uwa people of Colombia, out of a total population of about 7,000.

== Varieties ==
There are half a dozen known varieties. Communication between modern varieties can be difficult, so they are considered distinct languages.

Adelaar (2004) lists the living

- central dialects Cobaría and Tegría on the northern slopes of the Sierra Nevada del Cocuy,
- a western group near Agua Blanca in the departments of Santander and Norte de Santander,
- an eastern group at a place called Barro Negro in the lowlands of Arauca and Casanare,
- and the extinct dialect Sínsiga near Chita, Boyacá.

Umaña (2012) lists Cobaría, Tegría, Agua Blanca, Barro Negro.

Berich lists the dialects Cobaría; Agua Blanca (= Uncasía, Tamarana, Sta Marta); Rinconada, Tegría, Bócota, & Báchira

Cassani lists Sínsiga, Tegría, Unkasía (= Margua), Pedraza, Manare, Dobokubí (= Motilón)

Osborn (1989) lists

- Bethuwa (= Pedraza, extinct),
- Rikuwa (Dukarúa, = Agua Blanca),
- Tagrinuwa (Tegría),
- Kubaruwa (Cobaría),
- Kaibaká (= Bókota),
- Yithkaya (= San Miguel / Barro Negro),
- Bahiyakuwa (= Sínsiga),
- Biribirá,
- and Ruba,

the latter all extinct

Fabre (2005) lists:

- Bontoca (perhaps the same as the Bókota = Kaibaká cited in Osborn), of the mountains of Guican
- Cobaría, along the Cobaría River
- Pedraza or Bethuwa [= Angosturas?], along the Venezuelan border; extinct
- Sínsiga, in the Guican mountains, recorded from Chita, Boyaca in 1871
- Tegría or Tagrinuwa, along the Cobaría River
- Unkasia, along the Chitiga and Marga rivers (Telban 1988)

Additional names in Loukotka are Manare and Uncasica (presumably a spelling variant of Unkasía/Uncacía), as well as Morcote, of which nothing is known. Manare, at the source of the Casanare, is Eastern Tunebo.

== Phonology ==
=== Vowel ===
	Front	Back
High	i	u
Mid	e	o
Low	a	

=== Consonants ===
	Labial	Alveolar	Palatal	Velar	Labio-velar	Glottal
Nasal	m	n				
Stop	b	t		k	kʷ	ʔ
Fricative		s	ʃ			h
Vibrant		r				
Oral semi-vowel	w		j			
Nasal semi-vowel	w̃					

== Morphosyntax ==
Uwa is an ergative–absolutive language with an SOV word order.

=== Nouns ===
All isolated verbs end in -a. Nouns can be divided into three groups: personal nouns, verbal nouns, and other. The plurality of a referent is not explicitly marked on a verb; however, it is possible to mark a group of human referents using the -in suffix. Some kinship terms use a different term instead of using the -in suffix (e.g., wacjá ‘son’; sasa ‘sons’). Verbal nouns are derived from verbs by appending -quib (refers to one actor, e.g., yew̃quib ‘he who carries’), -quin (refers to multiple actors, e.g., yew̃quin ‘those who carry’) or -quey (the action, e.g., raquey ‘the coming’, OR the patient of an action, e.g., rojoquey ‘that which is brought’). Other nouns cannot be affixed with the aforementioned suffixes.

There are four case suffixes: ergative, absolutive, genitive and vocative.

The subject of a transitive clause, i.e., the ergative case, is marked with the -at suffix:

Bónit-at eb yá-ca-ro.
mouse-ERG corn eat-PRES-DECL
A mouse is eating the corn.

The subject of an intransitive clause or the object of a transitive clause, i.e., the absolutive case, takes the null suffix -∅:

As isura be-n-ro.
I down go-INTEN-DECL.
I'm going down [stairs].

Ow-at as cuá-ca-ro.
suitcase-ERG my tire-PRES-DECL
The suitcase is killing me.

The owner of a referent is marked with the genitive case using the -ay suffix. It can replace the ergative marker -at in the 1st person singular pronoun of transitive sentences.

Eb quehrós yay ay-ti quehw̃u-wa. Is-ay-an bar ri-jac-cua-no.
corn parrot eat leave-NEG frighten-IMP our-GEN-EMP already plant-PASS-USIT-DECL.
Shoo away the parrots so that they don't eat the corn. Ours is already planted.

The vocative suffix -u is used to identify a referent being addressed:

Wanis-u
Wanisa-VOC
Wanisa!

=== Personal pronouns ===
The personal pronouns distinguish between the 1st, 2nd and 3rd person (which is further divided into proximal and distal), as well as between the singular and plural:

		singular	plural
1st person		asa, as	isa, is
2nd person		baha, bah	baa
3rd person	proximal	uiya	uiyina
3rd person	distal	eya, ey	eyina, eyin

It is possible to use personal pronouns as possessive pronouns by placing them before the relevant noun (for comparison—adjectives are placed after the noun). However, there exist distinct forms of possessives, which will be discussed later.

The demonstrative pronouns make a two-way distinction: ucha (proximal, ‘this’) and eya (distal, ‘that’).

Additionally, there exists an intensifier-reflexive pronoun that is analogous to the English ‘oneself’ or ‘alone’. The pronoun itself is subject to inflection:

	singular	plural
1st person	ajmar, amar	ijmár
2nd person	behmar	bemar
3rd person	ima	imar

The possessive pronouns in Uwa, just like the personal pronouns, make a proximal-distal distinction in the 3rd person. These are:

		singular	plural
1st person		ajáy	isay
2nd person		bahay	bay
3rd person	proximal	uiyay	uiyinay
3rd person	distal	eyay	eyinay

=== Numerals ===
The Uwa language uses a base-10 (decimal) number system.

=== Adjectives ===
In general, adjectives are placed after the noun, although there are instances where they can be placed before it. Nevertheless, the majority of the time, adjectives are utilized in the verbal form:

cúmac-ro
big-DECL
It is big.

Carson bacsoy racat-ro.
pants black want-DECL
I want black pants.

In noun phrases, the adjective tends to take the -a suffix.

=== Verbs ===
Verbs in Uwa language can be divided into the following categories: transitive, intransitive, bitransitive, impersonal, objective clause, auxiliary and copular.

- Intransitive verbs take one argument, with just one participant:

Asa rícara wiqui-n-ro
I day return-INTEN-DECL
I will return by day.

- Transitive verbs take two arguments, thus implying two participants:

Aj-át bajít wá-ro-ra.
I-ERG machete buy-DECL-CNTR
I bought a machete.

- Bitransitive verbs take three arguments, which means three participants are involved in the action:

Babcar ac cuncuari bacáy bi-ca-ro.
Babcara DEST calabash leave go-PRES-DECL
I'm going to leave the calabash for Babcara.

- Impersonal verbs express involuntary actions or states that befall a person; those include verbs like to bleed, to vomit, to be tired. Due to their inherent non-agentivity, impersonal verbs lack full conjugation.

As bar seo-jac-ro.
I already tire-PST-DECL
I'm tired [of it]. / I've had enough.

- There are certain verbs that refer to the act of speaking, perceiving, or thinking, and these verbs are often followed by a dependent clause that provides more information about the action. These dependent clauses are called objective clauses. In Uwa, examples of such verbs include séhlw̃anro ‘to think’ and waquinro ‘to say’.

“As-ra bar be-n-ro,” wa-no-ra.
[I-CONT already go-INTEN-DECL] say-DECL-CONT
I said, “I'm leaving [now].”

The verb séhlw̃anro is most frequently preceded by the intentional form of the verb without the declarative suffix:

As ucasi ac be-n séhlw̃a-ro.
I ten DEST go-INTEN think-DECL
I plan on going for ten days.

- Auxiliary verbs follow the verb or adjective and carry the tense and mood suffixes. These include: yajquinro ‘to do’, cháquinro ‘to put’, tenro ‘to overcome’, rehquinro ‘to be’, rauwinro ‘to enter’ and óraro ‘to suppose’.
- There is only one copular verb, rehquinro, which comes from the word for ‘to be’.

Cuc wini reh-ca-ro.
thirst give be-PRES-DECL
[He] is thirsty.

Cue reh-ti ja-w̃i.
sad be-NEG AUX-IMP
Don't be sad.

There are a number of different affixes that can appended to the verb.

The intentional suffixes -in and -n indicate the intention to be fulfilled by the action of the verb. The action occurs in the future.

Bacat ubach tuw̃-in-ro.
four house clean-INTEN-DECL
In four days I'm going to do the house.

Negation can be marked three ways. Future, ability or obligation, and stative verbs are negated with the word bár. Inability or impossibility is marked with -ajar/-ajat in the main verb and with an interrogative word in the same clause, plus an -i suffix on the focused word of focus. The -ti suffix is used on the main verb:

Ahajira bahnaqu-i sín-ti-ro.
still everything-EMP.NEG learn-NEG-DECL
I have not yet learned everything.

Ability or obligation is indicated in the verb by the suffix -ata. It indicates that something can or must be done. It can also function as a way to express command without using the imperative.

The inability is indicated by appending the suffix -ajar:

Is oya bár bin-at-ra ay éy-in-ra yéhw̃-ajar-cua-no.
we clothing not who-ERG-CONT good 3-COL-CONT marry-IMPOSS-USIT-DECL
We poor people cannot marry the good ones.

Four tenses can be distinguished: present, past, immediate past and immediate future.

Tense	Suffix
past	-jac/-jec/-joc
immediate past	-ira/-iri
present	-ca (Note: One of the exceptions is the word tew̃ro ‘is speaking’.)
immediate future	-ayquira

The suffixes -ca/-qui and -ya/-yi are used to mark questions in the present and past tenses, respectively.

=== Adverbs ===
Adverbs are positioned immediately following the verb:

In ra-w̃i.
fast come-IMP
Come quick.
