= Pan-Caribbean =

The concept of a "pan-Caribbean" culture area refers to recent proposals by an international group of archaeologists to the effect that contacts among Pre-Columbian peoples of the Yucatán Peninsula, the Antilles, Central America, and northern South America may have been more extensive than heretofore acknowledged. A pan-Caribbean perspective seeks to emphasize the importance of considering information from a broad area, one characterized as "the American Mediterranean," in evaluating issues of mobility, exchange, linguistics, ideology, art, material culture, and identity. The pan-Caribbean area was one whose peoples interacted regularly with those of Mesoamerica, the Isthmo-Colombian area, and the Amazon basin, creating a context that had significant effects on culture change throughout a large portion of the Americas.

The culture of the Caribbean people as practiced and experienced among the islands of the Caribbean sea, that stretch from the Bahamas in the north to the mainland shores of the Guianas in the south. Caribbean anthropologist, like their colleagues in sociology, history, geography, political science, are increasingly expanding the frontiers of their respective disciplines to overlap and encompass previous academic boundaries in their quest to effectively represent and interpret the heterogeneity of the Caribbean experience. In terms of the social context of Caribbean people, an increasingly important issue archaeologists are addressing relates to the identification of culture diversity. In recent years, a growing body of indigenous voices in Caribbean archaeology is expressing disdain for and resistance to the hegemony of colonialist interpretations of Caribbean pre-Columbian history. As such, new historical frameworks and visions of past dynamics have become centers of active scholarship in Caribbean archaeology.
