= Pito =

Pito may refer to:

- Pito (beer), a type of beer made from fermented millet or sorghum in northern Ghana, parts of Nigeria, and other parts of West Africa
- Pito Pérez (active since 2000), a Mexican rock band originally from Guadalajara
- Pito Salas (active since 1986), a Curacaoan-American Cambridge, Massachusetts-based software developer
- Jean Pierre Guisel Costa (born 1991), a Brazilian international futsal player
- PITO (UK) (used 1974–2007), the former Police Information Technology Organisation
- Erythrina berteroana, species of small deciduous tree in Latin America
