= Votic languages =

Branch of Chibchan languages spoken in Costa Rica and Nicaragua

Votic
- Geographic distribution: Costa Rica, Nicaragua
- Linguistic classification: Chibchan: Votic
- Subdivisions: Rama; Maléku; ?Corobicí † (unattested); Huetar †

Language codes
- Glottolog: voti1248

The Votic languages are a branch of Chibchan languages spoken in Costa Rica and Nicaragua.

- Rama, also known as Melchora, Voto, Boto, Arama and Arrama
- Maléku (Guatuso)
