= Chirripó River =

River in Costa Rica

Chirripó River is a river of Costa Rica.
