= Uren River =

River in Costa Rica

Uren River is a river of Costa Rica.
