= Matina River =

Costa Rican River

Matina River is a river of Costa Rica.
