= Chibchan languages =

Language family of Central and South America

Chibchan
- Geographic distribution: Mosquitia, Panama, and Colombia
- Native speakers: 257,500 (2007)
- Linguistic classification: One of the world's primary language families
- Subdivisions: Pech; Isthmic; Votic; Magdalena

Language codes
- ISO 639-5: cba
- Glottolog: chib1249
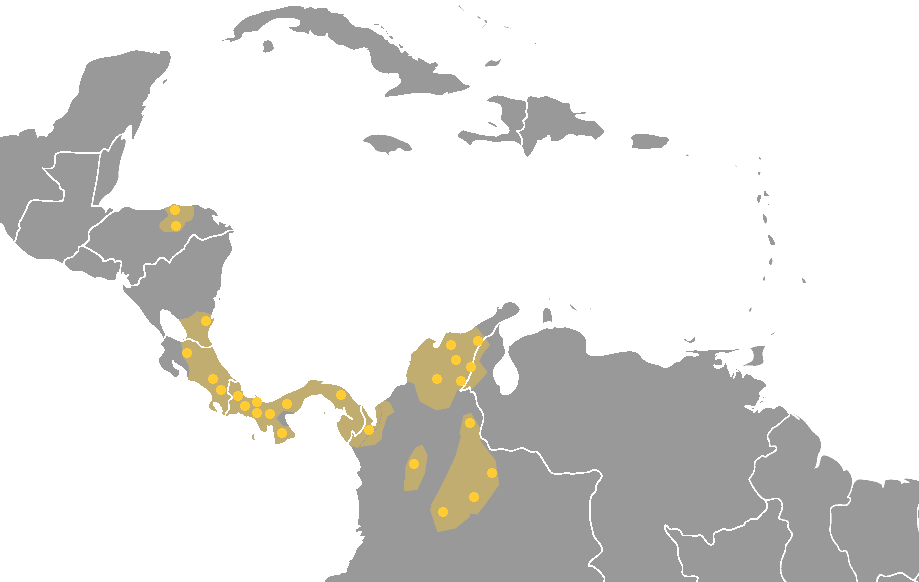
- Distribution of the Chibchan languages

The Chibchan languages (also known as Chibchano) are a language family indigenous to the Isthmo-Colombian Area, a geo-cultural region extending from Mosquitia in eastern Central America to northern Colombia, and encompassing parts of Costa Rica and Panama. The name derives from the now-extinct Chibcha or Muisca language, once spoken on the Altiplano Cundiboyacense present day Colombia. Recent genetic and linguistic evidence now indicate that the original nucleus of Chibchan languages and peoples might not have been in Colombia, but along the south-eastern coast of Mosquitia, where the greatest diversity of Chibchan languages has been identified.

== External relations ==
A larger family called Macro-Chibchan, which would contain the Misumalpan languages, Xinca, and Lenca, was found convincing by Kaufman (1990).

Based primarily on evidence from grammatical morphemes, Pache (2018, 2023) suggests a distant relationship with the Macro-Jê languages.

A map showing approximately two dozen Chibchan languages in their approximate locations throughout Central America and northern South America

== Language contact ==
Jolkesky (2016) notes that there are lexical similarities with the Andaki, Barbakoa, Choko, Duho, Paez, Sape, and Taruma language families due to contact.

== Classification ==
The Chibchan family was first formally recognized by Max Uhle in an 1890 publication in the journal of the International Congress of Americanists entitled Verwandtschaften und Wanderungen der Tschibtscha ("Kinships/relationships and migrations of the Chibcha".

=== Loukotka (1968) ===
Below is a full list of Chibchan language varieties listed by Loukotka (1968), including names of unattested varieties. Loukotka also included other language families, like Barbacoan, Kamëntšá (Camsá), and Paezan, which are no longer accepted as Chibchan.

Chibchan language varieties listed by Loukotka (1968)

Rama group

- Rama – language spoken around Bluefields Lagoon and on the Rama River, Nicaragua.
- Melchora – extinct language once spoken on the San Juan Melchoras River, Nicaragua. (Unattested.)

Guatuso group

- Guatuso – spoken on the Frío River, Costa Rica, now perhaps extinct.
- Guetar / Brusela – extinct language once spoken on the Grande River, Costa Rica.
- Suerre / Camachire / Chiuppa – extinct language once spoken on the Tortuguero River, Costa Rica. (Benzoni 1581, p. 214, only five words.)
- Pocosi – extinct language once spoken on the Matina River and around the modern city of Puerto Limón, Costa Rica. (Unattested.)
- Voto – extinct language once spoken at the mouth of the San Juan River, Costa Rica. (Unattested.)
- Quepo – extinct language once spoken in Costa Rica on the Pacuare River. (W. Lehmann 1920, vol. 1, p. 238, only one single word.)
- Corobisi / Corbesi / Cueresa / Rama de Rio Zapote – spoken by a few individuals in Costa Rica on the Zapote River. (Alvarez in Conzemius 1930, pp. 96–99.)

Talamanca group

- Terraba / Depso / Quequexque / Brurán – extinct language once spoken in Costa Rica on the Tenorio River.
- Tirub / Rayado / Tiribi – extinct language spoken once in Costa Rica on the Virilla River.
- Bribri / Lari – spoken on the Coca River and Tarire River, Costa Rica.
- Estrella – Spanish name of an extinct language, the original name of which is unknown, once spoken on the Estrella River, Costa Rica.
- Cabecar – language spoken on the Moy River, Costa Rica.
- Chiripó – language spoken in Costa Rica on the Matina River and Chirripó River.
- Viceyta / Abiseta / Cachi / Orosi / Tucurrique – extinct language once spoken on the Tarire River, Costa Rica.
- Brunca / Boruca / Turucaca – extinct language of Costa Rica, spoken on the Grande River and in the Boruca region.
- Coto / Cocto – extinct language once spoken between the sources of the Coto River and Grande River, Costa Rica. (Unattested.)

Dorasque group

- Chumulu – extinct language once spoken in El Potrero, Veraguas (Potrero de Vargas), Panama.
- Gualaca – extinct language once spoken on the Chiriqui River, Panama.
- Changuena – once spoken in Panama, on the Changuena River.

Guaymi group

- Muoi – extinct language once spoken in the Miranda Valley of Panama.
- Move / Valiente – now spoken on the Guaymi River and in the Veragua Peninsula.
- Norteño – dialect without an aboriginal name, spoken on the northern coast of Panama, now perhaps extinct.
- Penonomeño – once spoken in the village of Penonomé.
- Murire / Bucueta / Boncota / Bogota – spoken in the Serranía de Tabasara by a few families.
- Sabanero / Savaneric / Valiente – extinct dialect without aboriginal name, once spoken on the plains south of the Serranía de Tabasara.
- Pariza – extinct dialect spoken in the Conquest days on the Veragua Peninsula. (G. Espinosa 1864, p. 496, only one single word.)

Cuna group

- Coiba – extinct language once spoken on the Chagres River, Panama. (W. Lehmann 1920, vol. I, pp. 112–122; A. Santo Tomas 1908, pp. 124–128, only five words.)
- Cuna / Bayano / Tule / Mandingo / San Blas / Karibe-Kuna / Yule – language spoken in eastern Panama, especially on the Bayano River, in San Blas and the small islands on the northern coast.
- Cueva / Darien – extinct language Once spoken at the mouth of the Atrato River, Colombia.
- Chochama – extinct language once spoken on the Suegro River, Panama. (Unattested.)

Antioquia group

- Guazuzú – once spoken in the Sierra de San Jerónimo, department of Antioquia, Colombia. (Unattested.)
- Oromina / Zeremoe – extinct language once spoken south of the Gulf of Urabá, Antioquia, Colombia. (Unattested.)
- Catio – once spoken in the region of Dabaiba, Colombia. (only a few words.)
- Hevejico – once spoken in the Tonusco and Ebéjico Valleys. (Unattested.)
- Abibe – once spoken in the Sierra de Abibe. (Unattested.)
- Buritaca – once spoken at the sources of the Sucio River. (Unattested.)
- Caramanta – once spoken around the city of Caramanta.
- Cartama – once spoken around the modern city of Cartama. (Unattested.)
- Pequi – once spoken in the Pequi region. (Unattested.)
- Arma – once spoken on the Pueblanco River. (Unattested.)
- Pozo – once spoken on the Pozo River and Pacova River. (Cieza de Leon 1881, p. 26, only one single word.)
- Nutabé – once spoken in the San Andrés Valley.
- Tahami – once spoken on the Magdalena River and Tora River. (Unattested.)
- Yamesi – once spoken at the mouth of the Nechi River and on the Porce River. (Simon 1882–1892, vol. 5, p. 80, only one single word.)
- Avurrá – once spoken in the Aburrá Valley. (Piedrahita (Fernandez de Piedrahita) 1688, cap. 2, f. 9, only one single word.)
- Guamoco – once spoken around the modern city of Zaragoza, Antioquia. (Unattested.)
- Anserma / Humbra / Umbra – once spoken on the Cauca River around the city of Anserma, Caldas. (J. Robledo 1865, pp. 389 and 392, only a few words.)
- Amachi – once spoken in the San Bartolomé Valley. (Unattested.)

Chibcha group

- Chibcha / Muisca / Mosca – extinct language once spoken on the upper plateau of Bogotá and Tunja, department of Cundinamarca, Colombia.
  - Duit dialect – once spoken on the Tunja River and Tundama River.
- Tunebo / Tame – language now spoken by many tribes living in the area east of the Chibcha tribe. Dialects:
  - Tegría – spoken on the Tegría River, department of Boyaca. (Rochereau 1926–1927, 1946–1950, 1959.)
  - Pedraza – spoken on the Pedraza River.
  - Boncota – spoken on the Boncota River.
  - Manare – spoken on the Manare River.
  - Sinsiga / Chita – spoken in the village of Chita, Boyacá and on the Chisca River.
  - Uncasica – spoken in the Sierra Librada.
  - Morcote – spoken on the Tocaría River and in the village of Morcote. (Unattested.)
- Chitarero – extinct language once spoken around the modern city of Pamplona, department of Santander. (Unattested.)
- Lache – extinct language once spoken on the Chicamocha River and in the Sierra de Chita, department of Boyacá. (Unattested.)

Motilon group

- Dobocubí / Motilon – spoken on the Tarra River and around the old mission of Atacarayo, department of Norte de Santander, Colombia.
- Bartra / Cunaguasáya – spoken by a tribe on the Oro River, Rincón River, and Lora River in the Norte de Santander region.
- Mape – spoken by a little known tribe on the Catatumbo River and Agua Blanca River in the Norte de Santander region and in the state of Zulia, Venezuela.

Arhuaco (Arwako) group

- Tairona / Teyuna – extinct language once spoken on the Frio River and on the Caribbean coast, department of Magdalena, Colombia, now a secret language of the priests in the Cagaba tribe.
- Zyuimakane – extinct language once spoken on the Volador River in the same region. (Unattested.)
- Bungá – extinct language once spoken on the Santa Clara River. (Unattested.)
- Ulabangui – once spoken on the Negro River, in the Santa Clara River region. (Unattested.)
- Cashingui – once spoken on the Palomino River. (Unattested.)
- Masinga – once spoken on the Bonda River, in the Palomino River region. (Unattested.)
- Bonda / Matuna – once spoken on the Bonda River and Santa María River. (Holmer 1953a, p. 313, only one single word; Preuss 1927, only a few toponyms.)
- Cágaba / Köggaba / Kaugia / Koghi – language spoken in the Sierra Nevada de Santa Marta in the villages of San Andrés, San Miguel, San José, Santa Rosa, and Pueblo Viejo.
- Guamaca / Nábela / Sanha / Arsario – spoken in the Sierra Nevada de Santa Marta region in the villages of El Rosario, Potrerito, and Marocaso.
- Bintucua / Ijca / Ika / Iku / Machaca / Vintukva – spoken in the Sierra Nevada de Santa Marta region in the village of San Sebastián (near Atanquez).
- Atanque / Campanaque / Busintana / Buntigwa / Kallwama – spoken in the Sierra Nevada de Santa Marta, in the village of Atanquez.
- Upar / Eurpari / Giriguana – extinct language once spoken on the César River. (Unattested.)
- Cariachil – once spoken between the Molino River and Fonseca River. (Unattested.)
- Ocanopán / Itoto – once spoken around Cerro Pintado. (Unattested.)

Paya group

- Paya / Poyuai / Seco – language spoken on the Guayape River and between the Patuca River and Sico River, Honduras.

=== Constenla ===
The Costa Rican linguist Adolfo Constenla Umaña proposes a typology of Chibchan languages in four branches. From north to south,

- Chibchan
  - A
    - Waimí (Guaymi)
      - Guaymí (Ngäbere, Movere) – 170,000 speakers, vulnerable in Panama, endangered in Costa Rica
      - Buglere (Bokotá) – 18,000 speakers, endangered
    - †Borũca (Brunca)
    - Talamanca
      - Bribri (Talamanca), 7,000 speakers – vulnerable in Costa Rica, endangered in Panama
      - Cabécar (Talamanca) – 8,800 speakers, vulnerable
      - Teribe (Norteño) – 3,300 speakers, endangered
  - B
    - Pech (Paya) – 990 speakers, endangered
    - †Dorasque
    - Votic
      - †Huetar (Güetar)
      - Rama – 740 speakers, moribund
      - Maléku (Guatuso) – 750 speakers, endangered
      - †Corobicí – northwestern Costa Rica
      - †Voto
    - Guna–Colombian
      - Guna (Dulegaya) – 60,600 speakers, vulnerable in Panama, endangered in Colombia
      - Chibcha–Motilon
        - Barí (Motilón) – 5,000 speakers, vulnerable
        - Chibcha–Tunebo
          - †Muisca
          - †Duit
          - U'wa (Tunebo) – 2,550 speakers, endangered
          - †Guane – Colombia
      - Arwako–Chimila
        - Chimila – 350 speakers, endangered
        - Arwako
          - Wiwa (Malayo, Guamaca) – 1,850 speakers, endangered
          - †Kankuamo
          - Arhuaco (Ikʉ) – 8,000 speakers, vulnerable
          - Kogi (Cogui) – 9,910 speakers, vulnerable

Constenla initially classified the Huetar language as belonging to the Talamanca branch, however, in his last classification from 2008, he included it as a “probable affiliation” among the votic languages. Loukotka (1968), Quesada (1996) and Jolkesky (2016) have classified the Huetar as Votic as well.

The extinct languages of Antioquia, Old Catío and Nutabe have been shown to be Chibchan (Adelaar & Muysken, 2004:49). The language of the Tairona is unattested, apart from a single word, but may well be one of the Arwako languages still spoken in the Santa Marta range. It is said to be used by the Kogi people as a shamanistic ritual language. The Zenú a.k.a. Sinú language of northern Colombia is also sometimes included, as are the Malibu languages, though without any factual basis. Zenú is also sometimes linked with the Chocoan languages.

Adolfo Constenla Umaña argues that Cueva, the extinct dominant language of Pre-Columbian Panama long assumed to be Chibchan based on a misinterpreted Guna vocabulary, was actually Chocoan, but there is little evidence.

The Cofán language (Kofán, Kofane, A'ingae) of Ecuador and Colombia has been erroneously included in Chibchan due to borrowed vocabulary.

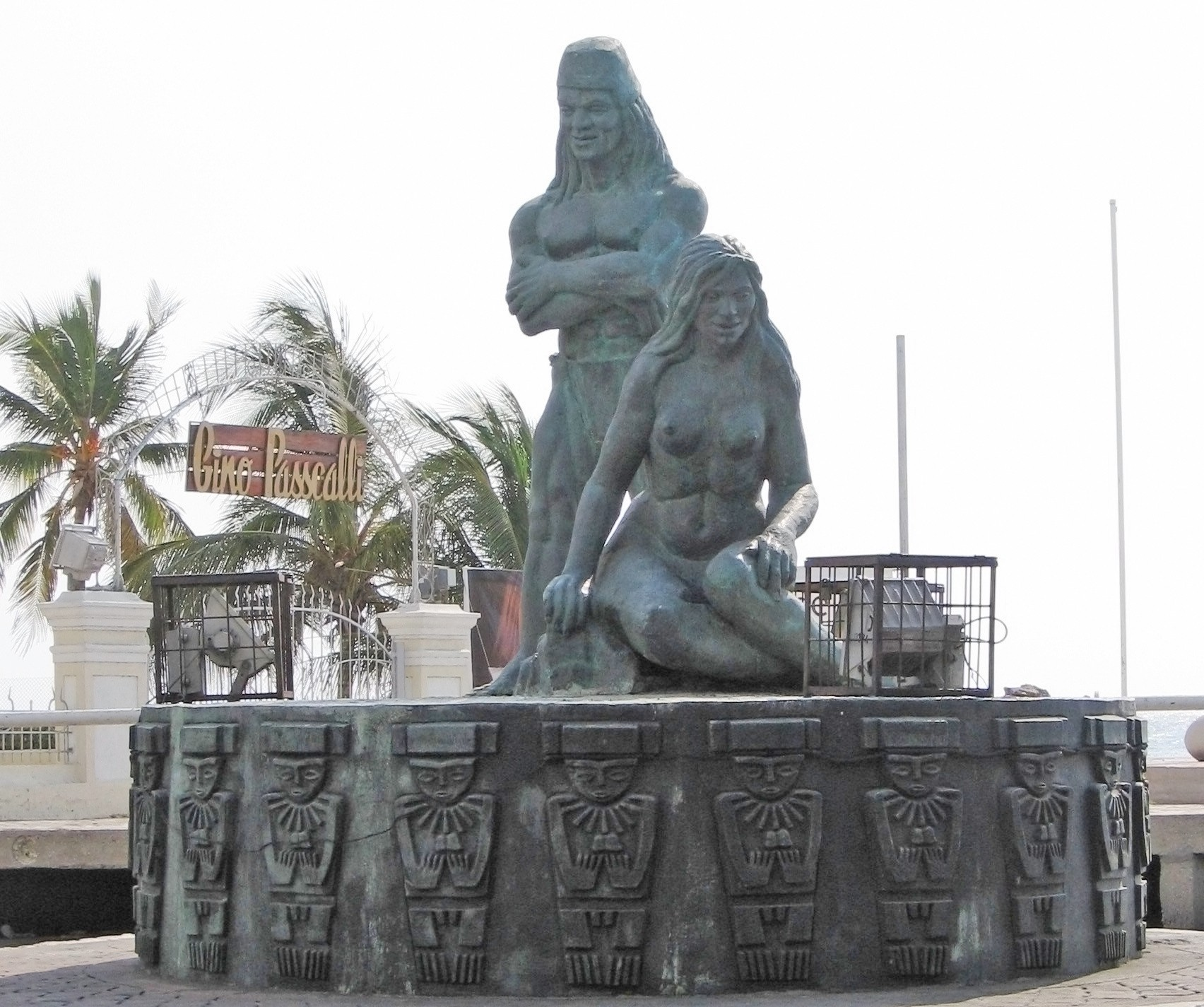
Monument to the Tairona people in Santa Marta

On the basis of shared grammatical innovations, Pache (2023) argues that Pech is most closely related to the Arhuacic languages of northern Colombia, forming a Pech-Arhuacic subgroup.

=== Jolkesky (2016) ===
Internal classification by Jolkesky (2016):

(† = extinct)

- Chibcha
  - Pech
  - Votic
    - Maleku
    - Rama
    - †Wetar
  - Isthmic
    - Boruka-Talamanca
      - Boruka
      - Talamanca
        - Teribe
        - Bribri-Kabekar
          - Bribri
          - Kabekar
    - Doraske-Changena
      - †Changena
      - †Doraske
    - Guaymi
      - Buglere
      - Ngäbe
    - Kuna
      - Kuna Paya-Pukuro
      - Kuna San Blas
  - Magdalena
    - Barí
    - Chimila
    - †Nutabe
    - U'wa
    - Muisca
      - †Guane
      - Muisca
    - Sierra de Santa Marta
      - Kaggaba
      - †Tairona
      - Wiwa-Ika
        - Ika
        - †Kankuamo
        - Wiwa

== Proto-language ==
Proto-Chibchan
- Reconstruction of: Chibchan languages

Pache (2018) is the most recent reconstruction of Proto-Chibchan. Other reconstructions include Holt (1986).

Below are Proto-Chibchan vowels according to Pache (2018). The vowels in parentheses (*ĩ, *e, *o and *õ) appear to have been marginal in the proto-language.

	Front	Central	Back
High	*i, *(ĩ)		*u, *ũ
Mid	*(e)		*(o), *(õ)
Low		*a, *ã	

Below are Proto-Chibchan consonants as described by Pache (2018). Notably, the proto-language lacked separate nasal stop phonemes and had one liquid consonant, *L, whose exact pronunciation is unknown. Pache speculates it could have been realized as one or more of the following: [ɾ, ɽ, ɺ, l, r].

		Labial	Coronal	Velar	Labiovelar	Glottal
Stop	plain	*p	*t	*k	*kʷ	*ʔ
Stop	prenasal	*ᵐb	*ⁿd	*ᵑɡ	*ᵑɡʷ	
Affricate			*ts			
Fricative			*s			*h
Liquid			*L			

=== Constenla (1981) ===
Proto-Chibchan reconstructions by Constenla (1981):

Proto-Chibchan reconstructions by Constenla (1981)

gloss	Proto-Chibchan
arm, hand, shoulder	*ˈkuíkI, *ˈkuí-
ashes	*bur-, *buˈrṹ
at, in	*skA; *ki; *sə
at, in, towards	*ka
big (size or quantity)	*təˈĩ
bird	*dù
blood	*ApÍ
boat, craft	*huˈLù
body	*AˈpÀ
bone	*ˈkàrə
breasts	*kAʔ
breast	*ˈtsúʔ, *ˈtsúʔtsú
brother	*səˈkə
brother-in-law	*ˈuba; *ˈduáʔ
butterfly	*kuA-, *kuAʔ-
cedar (several trees of the Cedrela genus)	*uˈru
ceiba	*puLí, *puLíkI
child, young of an animal, egg	*əˈrə̀
child, young of an animal	*ˈuÁʔ-
cloth	*ˈsuá-
cloud	*ˈbõ̀, *bo-
cockroach	*ˈsóx-
cocoa	*kə́ˈhùʔ
come	*ˈda-; *ˈdI-
cook	*ˈdu-
cotton	*suˈhí
cough, catarrh	*ˈtóʔ
crocodile	*ˈkú-
cultivated field	*ˈtÌ
curassow (Crax rubra)	*ˈdubÍ
deer	*ˈsur, *ˈsurĩ̀
diminutive	*-ˈaːrə
dog	*ˈto
dove (common ground dove)	*ˈÚtu-
dry	*diˈsə-
dry season	*ˈduá-
eagle, hawk	*ˈpṹ
ear	*ˈkuhkə́, *ˈkuhkuə́
eat, drink	*ˈga-
egg, sprout, suckling	*ˈpú
emerald toucanet	*dəˈkər̃ə́
enter	*ˈdok-
excrement	*ˈgã́
eye	*úb
face	*uˈbə́
father	*ˈkáka
feline	*dəbə̃́; *kuLÁʔ
find	*ˈkũ
finger, hand	*ˈkU
firewood, fire, coal, live coal	*ˈgÌ
first person prefix	*də̃-
fish	*ˈuA; *dibÃ̀
five	*sAkẽ́
flesh	*gAtA
fly	*ˈkulu
foot	*sAˈkə̃
four	*bəhˈke
fruit	*ubə́
give birth	*ˈgU-
gnat (jején)	*buˈr̃ṹʔ
go	*ˈdA-
grease	*ˈkiə́
grind	*ˈuʔ
grindstone, to sharpen	*ˈiáʔ
grow, widen	*təˈlə-
guan (bird)	*ˈkũ̀
hand	*AtA; *guLÀ
head, hair	*ˈtsã̀
house	*ˈhu
how many	*ˈbi
hunger	*bAˈLi
I	*ˈda
jocote (Spondias purpurea), jobo (Spondias mombin)	*bəˈrə́ʔ
kill	*ˈguə
know, see	*sũ
lake	*iAˈbÁ
laugh	*ˈhaĩ
laurel (Cordia alliodora)	*ˈBúʔ
leaf	*ˈkə́
leg	*kəˈrə
liquid	*dí; *ˈli
lizard	*ulíʔ
louse	*ˈkṹ
maize	*ˈIBI
make	*gU
mayo (tree)	*bèk
monkey: howler monkey	*úriʔ
monkey: spider monkey	*dõ̀, *do-
monkey: white-faced monkey	*hòkI
moon, month	*siˈhíʔ
mother-in-law	*ˈgAkA
mouse	*ˈsuhkÌ
mouth	*ˈkahkə
mud	*ˈdÚ; *oˈr̃i
name	*ˈhaká
nape, neck	*duˈkurə
neck	*ˈgala
net	*kAˈlÁʔ
nose	*dəˈIkI
now	*ˈBə
old	*AˈkÍkI; *tAˈlá
one	*ˈé ?
otter	*doʔ
paca (Agouti paca)	*ˈkuri
peachpalm (Bactris gasipaes, Guilelma utilis)	*ˈsúbaʔ
peccary (Tayassu pecari spiradens)	*siˈdĩ́ʔ
peel, undress	*ˈsu-
person	*ApÍ-
place, time, environment, land	*ˈká
plant	*ˈdi
poró tree, elequeme tree (synonyms)	*baˈlò
pot, vessel, jar	*ˈũ
pumpkin, squash	*Apì
rattle, maraca, colander, gourd cup (= object elaborated from a gourd)	*ˈtã́
reed	*kəˈru
rotten	*ˈdṹ
sand	*ˈu; *ˈuBA
say	*ˈguA-; *ˈgI
sea	*dAgÌ
second person prefix	*bi-
see	*ˈguəkI
seek	*ˈdí
seed, plant	*ˈpkua
seize, hold	*kaLUh-
seven	*ˈkúh-
shark	*tAˈLì
shrimp	*ˈkUs
sing	*ˈtA
six	*ˈted
skin, bark	*hukə́
sleep	*kAp-
small	*ˈ¢id
smell, odor	*hALÀ
snake	*tAkAbÌ
soil, earth, dirt, clay	*ˈtÁBA
son	*gAbÀ
spider	*óhk
squirrel	*kudã́
star	*bÌ-
stick (a spear), insert, put in	*ˈtsã
stone	*ˈhákI
sun	*dì; *ˈka; *dui
sweet	*bəˈlóʔ
tail	*ˈduhkI
tapir	*dAĩ́ʔ
take	*ˈgúʔ
tear	*ˈubə́diə
that	*ˈhéʔ; *ˈse; *ˈkue; *ˈdiÀ
third person	*i-; *A
this	*ˈdi-; *ˈhíʔ
three	*ˈbai
tobacco	*ˈdu, *ˈduə̀
tongue	*pkúʔ, *ˈpkuə́
tooth	*ˈtu; *aˈkə
toucan sp.	*Biˈli
tray (made of wood, used to wash)	*kuˈLIʔ
transitive verb marker	*Bə-
tree	*ˈkàr; *kaˈri
tree, trunk of a tree, wood	*ˈkarə́
tuber	*ˈtuʔ
turtle	*kuÌ; *uˈli
two	*ˈbU
uncle	*kəˈru
vulva	*ˈkÍ
water	*ˈdíʔ
we (inclusive)	*ˈsẽ́ʔ
weep	*ˈbo
what	*ˈhi
where	*biə
white	*buLu
wind	*ˈBur-
with	*uA; *tÁ
woodpecker	*soˈr̃o
woods, firewood	*ˈbUʔ
work	*hiBA
worm	*ˈgĩ́
you (sg.)	*ˈbáʔ
yucca	*ˈik

Proto-Chibchan horticultural vocabulary (Constenla 2012):

- *dihke 'to sow'
- *te^{1} 'cultivated clearing'
- *ike 'manioc'
- *tuʔ 'tuber, yam' (Dioscorea spp.; Xanthosoma sagittifolium)
- *apì 'pumpkin, squash'
- *e, *ebe 'maize'
- *du, *dua^{1} 'tobacco'
- *tã^{1} 'rattles from gourd'
- *toka 'gourd cup'

=== Pache (2018) ===
Proto-Chibchan reconstructions by Pache (2018):

Proto-Chibchan reconstructions by Pache (2018)

gloss	Proto-Chibchan
all	*ᵐbaⁿd-; *pii-ⁿda
allative/dative	*ka
angry	*uⁿdu
arm, wing, shoulder	*kwik
armadillo	*ⁿduʔ
ashes	*ᵐbũⁿd(ũ)
aspect, imperfective	*-e
aspect, perfective	*-o
back	*ⁿda(kiⁿd) ~ *ta(kiⁿd); *ᵑga(ⁿda)
bad	*ᵑgwahⁿd; *saⁿd(a)
basket, mochila	*si
bat	*(ⁿdu-)ku(ⁿd)
to bathe, swim	*hauᵐb ~ *aᵐbuʔ
to be	*ⁿda(i) ~ *ta(i)
beam of light, heat	*ᵐbaʔ
beautiful	*ⁿdu
bee, honey	*La
bee, wasp	*ᵐbuⁿd(u)
to begin, start, first	*pahⁿd-
belly	*ita ~ *iⁿda ~ *iaⁿd
big	*ᵐbuⁿdi ~ *kuⁿdi ~ *kuiⁿd(i); *ᵐbu-ⁿda
bile, gall, bitter	*hakiʔ
bird, dove	*ⁿdu(ⁿd)
blood	*hapi ~ *apiʔ
to blow, fly	*kuʔ
body	*apa
bone, strong, hard	*kãⁿd-
bone, hard	*ⁿdaⁿdi ~ ⁿdaiⁿd- / saⁿdi ~ *saiⁿd-
breast, teat	*kãʔ; *ʦuʔ
breath, wind	*ᵐbuⁿd-
brother	*ⁿdaᵐba; *ⁿdaka / *saka
brother-in-law	*(ⁿd-)uᵐba
butterfly, hat	*kwahkwah
calabash	*ⁿdãᵐbã / *sãᵐbã; *taukaʔ
to catch, grasp	*ka
cedar	*uⁿdu
chicha	*ᵐba
chicken	*aʦa-kaⁿda
child	*ᵑgwaʔ
child, small	*ʦu
clay, mud	*(taBi-)ⁿda
cloud, fog	*ᵐba-
coal, hot coal	*kuⁿda
cold, cold substance	*ⁿdaᵐba-
cold	*ʦãĩh
to come	*ⁿda
comitative	*ⁿda ~ *ta; *uˈa; *ᵐba
to cook	*Li; *ⁿdu
cosmos (sky, day, time, space, earth, place)	*kaʔ(k)
creeping animal	*ⁿda(ⁿd) / *sa(ⁿd)
to dance	*kwi
dark	*tuⁿdi ~ *tuiⁿd
dative	*ia
diarrhea	*ᵑga-ⁿdi(a)
to do, make	*õ
dog	*tau
dove	*ⁿdu-ᵐba(ⁿd)
dry	*ⁿdiⁿda / *ⁿdisa; *puⁿd-
dust	*kaʔ(k)-puⁿd-
earth, floor, mud	*taB(a)
to eat	*kuⁿdi ~ *kuiⁿd
egg, offspring	*La
eight	*hap-
to enter	*ⁿdaʔ-u
excrement	*ᵑga
exterior	*ᵐbaⁿd(a) ~ *ᵐbat(a)
face	*ᵑgwa(k)
face, eye, fruit	*uᵐba
father	*ka(ka)
father, uncle, ancestor	*ⁿdũ(-i)
feather, wing, arm, hand	*ᵑgak
feline	*ⁿdaᵐba; *ku(ⁿd-)
field for cultivation	*tai
fireplace	*ᵑga-u (ka[k])
firewood	*ᵑgi
fish	*ᵑgwa ~ *uᵑg
flea	*ᵐbak-
foot, root	*kihʦa ~ *kihsa
four	*ᵐbahka(i)
friend, other	*pai
full	*(hi-)iⁿda ~ *(hi-)ita
to go	*ᵐb-; *ⁿdaʔ ~ *taʔ
god, wind	*siᵐba
to grow	*kuH ~ *ᵐbuH
hair, head	*ʦa
hand	*haⁿd- ~ *hat-
hand, arm	*ᵑguⁿdaʔ
hand, finger	*kuuʔ
to hear	*kuh
heart, liver, center	*ᵐbihⁿda ~ *ᵐbihta; *taH(ᵐba)
to holler	*ᵐbau(ⁿd) ~ *kau(ⁿd)
house	*hu
how much, how many	*ᵐbi-
human being	*ᵐbaⁿdi ~ *ᵐbaiⁿd
hummingbird	*ᵐbiʦi ~ *ᵐbisi
hunger	*ᵐbaⁿdi
I	*ⁿdaH(ⁿd)
instrumental/locative	*ⁿdi
jealous	*ᵐbau(ⁿd)
to kill	*ᵑgua
to know	*ᵑgw-
lake, rain	[*ⁿdi-ɡwa]
to laugh	*haⁿd
leaf	*ka
lightning	*Guⁿdi ~ *GuiHⁿd
lip	*uk-ⁿda
liquid	*ⁿdiʔ-a
liver	*haiⁿd
locative	*ⁿda ~ *ta; *ki; *ʦika ~ *tsaik
to look for, look after	*ⁿdi
louse	*kũʔ
maize	*aiB ~ aBi
manioc	*i(k)
meat, flesh	*ᵑgaʔⁿda ~ *ᵑgaʔta; *sih
monkey	*huⁿdĩ ~ uⁿdĩʔ
moon	*siʔ
mosquito	*ʦuiⁿd
mother-in-law, daughter-in-law	*ᵑgak
mouth	*kah-ka
mouth, vagina	*ʦipi
name	*haka ~ *akaʔ
nape	*ⁿdu-kuⁿd(a) / *ⁿdu-kus(a)
neck	*ᵑgaⁿda
net	*kaⁿdaʔ
new	*(a-)ᵐbihⁿd- ~ *(a-)ᵐbiht-
night, dark	*ʦii
nine, ten	*uk(a)
nominalizer	*-ᵐba; *-ⁿd-; *-ka
nose	*ⁿdii(k)
(older) sibling, (older) sister	*ᵑgwi
only	*ᵐbii
open	*kah
pale	*siʔ-kwa
palm	*huka
path	*hi
to peel	*suʔ
possessed	*-i
post, pole	*ʦauⁿd ~ *tsuⁿda
pot	*hũ
prick, sting, point	*ⁿduk / *suk
pumpkin, squash	*apii(s)
to put	*eʔ
raptor	*pũʔ
rattle	*taʔ
raw	*tah(-ka)
red, yellow, ripe	*taʔBa
relational element	*ⁿd(i)-; *ʦ(i)-
rodent, large	*kuⁿdi ~ *kuiⁿd
rodent, small	*suh(-kui)
rope, string	*ki
round	*ᵐbiⁿd(i)
salt	*ⁿdaᵑg
sand	*uB(V)(-ta)
to scratch, rub	*ʦuH
to see	*su
seed	*ⁿduⁿd-
seed, fruit	*kwa
seven	*kuh
side	*suuⁿd
to sit (singular)	*ʦaʔ
six	*taiⁿd-
skin	*huka ~ *huBa ~ kuaʔ
to sleep	*kap-
small	*Buⁿd-; *ʦiⁿd(a)
smell	*Laʔ
snake	*takaᵐb- ~ *taᵐbak
soft	*ʦiⁿdi
son, child	*ᵑgaᵐba
to sow	*ⁿdihk-
spoon, ladle	*ʦuiⁿd ~ *ʦuⁿdi
to stand (singular)	*ⁿdu-
stick, bone, tree	*kaⁿd- ~ *kat-
stomach	*ⁿduaᵐbih
stone	*hak ~ *kaʔ
sun, day	*ⁿdi
sun, year	*ⁿdu-
to swallow, drink, eat	*-hu ~ *-uʔ
sweet potato	*Baiʔ
tail	*ᵐbaⁿd(a)-; *ⁿduh(k)
to take	*ᵑgu
to take out, pick up	*hapi ~ *apiʔ
tasty	*ᵐbaⁿd-
tear	*uᵐba ⁿdiʔa
that	*a
this	*hi ~ *iʔ
three	*ᵐbãʔ(ĩ)
throat	*ᵐbi-ⁿdaʔ
throat, hole	*kuHⁿdi ~ *kuiHⁿd ~ *BuHⁿdi
tobacco	*ⁿdua
tongue	*kuʔ(-Ba)
tooth (molar)	*haka
tooth	*ⁿduʔ
turkey, large galliform bird	*(ᵑg)uⁿd-
to turn around	*ᵐbuⁿd- ~ *kuⁿd-
turtle	*kwi
to twist	*ᵐbu
two	*ᵐbuuʔ
up, sky	*ᵐbii
urine	*huʦi ~ *huiʦ
valency-reducer	*a-; *aʔ-; *aⁿd-
to walk	*ⁿdai
to wash	*suh(k)
to watch	*ᵑguⁿda ~ *ᵑgwaⁿd
water, river	*ⁿdiʔ
to wear	*(ⁿd)iˈa
white, morning	*ᵐbuⁿd(u)
who, someone	*ⁿdi
wind	*ᵐbuⁿd-kaⁿd(a)
woman (adult)	*ᵐbuⁿdi ~ *ᵐbuiⁿd ~ *ᵑguⁿdi ~ *ᵑguiⁿd
woman (young)	*ᵐbus-
worm	*ᵑgi
wound, trace	*saⁿda
to wrap	*ᵐbaʔk
you	*ᵐbaʔ
young, sprout	*pu

== Vocabulary ==
Muysc cubun	Duit Boyacá	Uwa Boyacá N. de Santander Arauca	Barí N. de Santander	Chimila Cesar Magdalena	Kogui S.N. de Santa Marta	Guna Darién Gap	Guaymí Panama Costa Rica	Boruca Costa Rica	Maléku Costa Rica	Rama Nicaragua	English	Notes
chie	tia	siʔ	chibai	má	saka	sö	sö	tebej	tlijii	tukan	Moon	
ata	atia	úbistia	intok	ti-tasu/nyé			kwati	éˇxi	dooka		one	
muysca			dary	tsá			ngäbe		ochápaká	nkiikna	person man people	
aba		eba		á							maize	
pquyquy				tò							heart	
bcasqua				yút		purkwe					to die	
uê				háta			ju		uu		house	
cho				mex				morén			good	
zihita				yén					pek-pen		frog	

== Bibliography ==
- Constenla Umaña, A. (1981). Comparative Chibchan Phonology. (Ph.D. dissertation, Department of Linguistics, University of Pennsylvania, Philadelphia).
- Constenla Umaña, A. (1985). Las lenguas dorasque y changuena y sus relaciones genealógicas. Filologia y linguística, 11.2:81–91.
- Constenla Umaña, Adolfo. (1991). Las lenguas del Área Intermedia: Introducción a su estudio areal. Editorial de la Universidad de Costa Rica, San José.
- Constenla Umaña, Adolfo. (1995). Sobre el estudio diacrónico de las lenguas chibchenses y su contribución al conocimiento del pasado de sus hablantes. Boletín del Museo del Oro 38–39: 13–56.
- Estudios de Lingüística Chibcha, a journal of Chibchan linguistics, is published by the Universidad de Costa Rica.
- Greenberg, Joseph H. (1987). Language in the Americas. Stanford: Stanford University Press.
- Headland, E. (1997). Diccionario bilingüe con una gramatica Uw Cuwa (Tunebo). Bogotá: Summer Institute of Linguistics.
- Holt, Dennis (1986). The Development of the Paya Sound-System. (Ph.D. dissertation, Department of Linguistics, University of California, Los Angeles).
- Margery Peña, E. (1982). Diccionario español-bribri, bribri-español. San José: Editorial Universidad de Costa Rica.
- Margery Peña, E. (1989). Diccionario Cabécar-Español, Español-Cabécar. Editorial de la Universidad de Costa Rica.
- Pinart, A. L. (1890). Vocabulario Castellano-Dorasque: Dialectos Chumulu, Gualaca y Changuina. (Petite Bibliothèque Américaine, 2). Paris: Ernest Leroux.
- Pinart, A. L. (1892). Vocabulario Guaymie: Dialectos Move-Valiente Norteño y Guaymie Penonomeño. (Petite Bibliothèque Américaine, 3). Paris: Ernest Leroux.
- Pinart, A. L. (1897). Vocabulario Guaymie: Dialectos Murıre-Bukueta, Mouı y Sabanero. (Petite Bibliothèque Américaine, 4). Paris: Ernest Leroux.
- Quesada, J. Diego (2007). The Chibchan Languages. Editorial Tecnológica de Costa Rica. ISBN 9977-66-186-3.
- Quesada Pacheco, M. A.; Rojas Chaves, C. (1999). Diccionario boruca-español, español-boruca. San José: Editorial de la Universidad de Costa Rica.
