= Lari River =

River in Costa Rica

Lari River is a river of Costa Rica.
