= Maléku language =

Chibchan language spoken in Costa Rica

Maléku
- Guatuso
- Maléku Jaíka
- Native to: Costa Rica
- Ethnicity: 1,070 Maléku people (200?)
- Native speakers: (750 cited 2000)
- Language family: Chibchan: Votic; Maléku
- Dialects: Margarita-El Sol; Tonjibe

Language codes
- ISO 639-3: gut
- Glottolog: male1297
- ELP: Guatuso
- Linguasphere: 81-DAA-aa
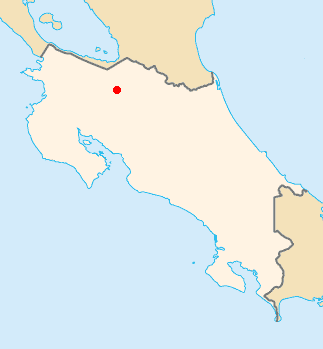

Maléku, also called Malecu, Guatuso, Watuso-Wétar, and Guetar, Maléku: Maléku Jaíka 'the speech of our people', is an Indigenous American language of the Chibchan family spoken in north-central Costa Rica, in the area of Guatuso, in the province of Alajuela, Costa Rica. It is spoken by around 300 to 460 indigenous Maléku people in an area of 2994 hectares, also called Guatusos.

== Classification ==
Maléku is a member of the Votic branch of the Chibchan language family. Maléku is considered to be endangered by the Endangered Languages Project. According to the 2011 National Population Census, 67.5% of the population that lives in the official Maléku territory declared that they speak the language; however, the state of vitality varies from one village to another and even among families (Sánchez 2011). In any case, following the parameters of UNESCO, the language can be classified as definitively endangered (Sánchez 2013).

== History ==
The Maleku people (usually called "Guatusos" in historical documents, travel chronicles of the 19th and 20th centuries, and in multiple academic studies) constitute one of the original peoples of the Costa Rican territory. While their contact with the Hispanic language and culture was extremely sporadic and limited at least until the second mid-nineteenth century (Constenla, 1988; Castillo, 2004), it can be assumed that this contact was intensified in the middle of the twentieth century.

== Geographic distribution ==
The Maléku live in three communities called Palenques in the northern area of Costa Rica: Margarita, Tonjibe and El Sol. According to Constenla (1998), Guatuso is in a state of decline in Margarita (the largest village) and in a state of resistance in Tonjibe and El Sol. At the 2000 census, 71.1% of the members of the ethnic group declared themselves to speak the language, but only 49% considered it as the mother tongue. The 2011 National Census of Population reported that 67.5% of the population in these communities speaks this language (Avendaño 2018).

== Education ==
The Ministry of Education (MEP, Minienciclopedia de los Territorios Indígenas de Costa Rica 2017) reported a Maléku population of 498 inhabitants. According to this institution, children attending schools in the region of Guatuso receive bilingual instruction in Maléku and Spanish. According to Espinoza Romero, Mejía Marín & Ovares Barquero 2011, the school, traditionally an acculturation mechanism, has not contributed to strengthening the Maléku identity. For instance, students receive instruction of core subjects in Spanish. They have to learn how to read and write in Spanish first. When they already read and write in the mainstream language, they can learn their language. The authors claim that the norm has been the teaching of the official language: Spanish and that despite the existence of educational policies that contemplate the revitalization of the use of indigenous languages in the region, there is an absence of strategies for teaching aboriginal languages.

== Dialects ==
The speakers of these three communities have declared that there are differences between the variety spoken by the communities of Margarita and El Sol and the one that is spoken by the people of Tonjibe (Avendaño 2018).

Corobicí is considered by some as a dialect of Guatuso; others consider it (or at least the words which are claimed to be recorded in it) as Rama. Not a word of the actual Corobicí language is known.

Mason considered it a variety of the Guatuso language in a "Rama-Corobici" subfamily of Chibchan, though he later revised the subfamily classification, saying "Guatuso, with its variety Corobici or Corbesi, and Rama with its dialect Melchora, are obviously very different from each other and from other Central American Chibchan languages, and Mason (1940) was evidently in error in making a Rama-Corobici subfamily." Voegelin and Voegelin also consider it a variety of Guatuso. Tozzer considers the Guatuso descendants of the Corobici, whereas Samuel Kirkland Lothrop writes that "It is generally assumed that the Rama were once a tribe identical in language and speech with the Corobici." Constenla writes that the extant "small sample of" Corobici is actually "words from the dialect of Rama that was spoken in the region of Upala, Costa Rica, up to the 1920s. Really, not a single word of the language of the Corobicies (an extinct group) was recorded."

== Documentation ==
As pointed out by Constenla 1998:3, little documentation of Maléku was recorded before the latter half of the 19th century. All records from that period are included in Walter Lehmann's 1920 volume on Central American languages.

The first scholar modern linguist to deeply study the Maléku language, aside from sources reproduced by Lehmann, was Adolfo Constenla Umaña, in collaboration with many members of the Maléku community, including especially among many others Eustaquio Castro Castro. A major dictionary of Maléku was published in 2023.

== Phonology ==
=== Vowels ===
Maleku has five phonemic vowel qualities, all of which occur in two different lengths, short and long, totalling 10 vowel phonemes.

Vowels
| | front | | central | | back | |
| | short | long | short | long | short | long |
|---|---|---|---|---|---|---|
| high | i | iː | | | u | uː |
| mid | e | eː | | | o | oː |
| low | | | a | aː | | |

Sánchez (1984) affirms that the vowel system of the Maleku is similar to Spanish (apart from length contrast); he cites some words with unlike VV sequences but is unclear if these are single nuclei or V.V.

Smith Sharp (1979) argues for V.V with an optional desyllabification of high vowels to approximants [w, j], in agreement with Costenla Umaña (1983).

=== Stress ===
Sánchez (1984) argues that stress is contrastive. The examples given suggest there may be role for morphological structure and vowel length in predicting stress placement. Smith Sharp (1979: 42) states En maleku, hay una sola oposición de acento. Cada palabra tiene por los menos un acento primario que no es predecible en palabras de dos o más sílabas. "In Maleku, there is only one accent opposition. Every word has at least one primary accent, which is not predictable in words of two or more syllables."

=== Consonants ===
The traditional consonant system of the Maleku includes fifteen phonemes:

| | | bilabial | dental | alveolar | palato- alveolar | velar |
|---|---|---|---|---|---|---|
| plosive/ affricate | voiceless | p | t̪ | | tʃ | k |
| plosive/ affricate | voiced | | | | dʒ | |
| fricative | central | ɸ | | s | | x |
| fricative | lateral | | | ɬ | | |
| nasal | | m | | n | | ŋ |
| liquid | trill | | | r | | |
| liquid | flap | | | ɾ | | |
| liquid | lateral | | | l | | |

Sánchez (1984) reports /t/ as 'dental-alveolar' and other coronals as 'alveolar'. Contrast between /ɬ, x/ appears to be in process of being lost in favor of /x/ (Costenla Umaña 1983). Influence from Spanish has added voiced stops and /ɲ/ to the modern colloquial language; these are not included in the inventories of Sánchez (1984), Smith Sharp (1983) or in the text counts of Krohn (2017). Costenla Umaña (1983) excludes them from his 'heritage inventory'.

=== Phonotactics ===
(C)V(ː)(C) seems to be the basic pattern, with no clusters, as suggested by Smith Sharp (1983: 44). Any C can occur in onset (except rhotics word-initially); any C except affricates, fricatives and /ɾ/ in coda. Sánchez (1984) gives 2 examples of word-internal CC codas /rɸ, rp/ in /irp-tʃia, irɸ-laŋ/ "drink it, eat it" and suggests CVCC as max syllable, but such examples are described as the result of an optional loss of a vowel in the 2nd person ergative prefix /riɸa/ by Costenla Umaña (1983: 18)

Canonical Form: (C)V(ː)(C)

Syllabic Restriction: (C)V(ː)(C)

== Writing system ==
The alphabet of Maleku was proposed by the linguist Adolfo Constenla, and it was adopted as official by the Asesoría de Educación Indígena del Ministerio de Educación Publica de Costa Rica.

=== Vowels ===
| phoneme | grapheme |
|---|---|
| а | a |
| e | e |
| i | i |
| o | o |
| u | u |

=== Consonants ===
| phoneme | grapheme |
|---|---|
| p | p |
| t | t |
| k | c,qu |
| tʃ | ch |
| dʒ | y |
| ɸ | f |
| s | s |
| x | j |
| ɬ | lh |
| l | l |
| ɾ | r |
| r | rr |
| m | m |
| n | n |
| ŋ | nh |

== Grammar ==
=== Word order ===
The basic order of the elements is variable in transitive and in intransitive clauses. In intransitive clauses the common order is SV, but it is also possible to find VS order.

Tó na- tóye
Yo 1E ir
I go

=== Subjects and objects ===
Maleku possesses an ergative–absolutive alignment system.

==== Subject of an intransitive verb ====
In intransitive clauses the subject is expressed in absolutive case. The affixes that appear in the verb establish a concordance of the person with the subject. These are:

intransitive clauses
| 1 person | 2 person | 3 person |
|---|---|---|
| na | -mi, -ma | -i, -a |

==== Subject of a transitive verb ====
In transitive clauses Maleku distinguishes between complete and incomplete transitive clauses. The affixes that appear in the verb are common in both constructions. These are

transitive clauses
| 1 person | 2 person | 3 person |
|---|---|---|
| -rra | -rrifa -rrif -rrf -rrip -rrfa -rrp | -rri |

==== Number ====
Maleku distinguishes between singular and plural in common nouns. The plural is expressed in two ways.

| | Example | Translation |
|---|---|---|
| duplicate noun | tocó →carú ear tocótocó → carúcarú ears |
| plural modifier "maráma" | yuquí → bowie knife yuquí maráma → bowie knives nalhacá → brother nalhacá maráma → brothers |

=== Personal pronouns ===
There are four personal pronouns in Maleku. These are:

| 1° person singular | 2° person singular | 1° person plural (exclusive) | 1° person plural (inclusive) |
|---|---|---|---|
| Tón~ tó→ I | pó~ púo→ you | Toí~ toí→ we | Tótiquí~ totiquí→ we |

== Vocabulary ==
- kapi kapi = hello (with a knocking gesture on your partner's shoulder)
- afekapian = Thank you
- w-ay = yes
- hebet = no
- fufu = morpho butterfly
- niskak = bird
- pili = toucan
- pek-pen = frog
- gnou-ek = red-eye frog
- ti-fakara = waterfall
- irri miotem? = what is your name?
- mioten ... = my name is ...
- arrachapi kahole = I would like a cup of coffee
- errekeki kerakou = let's go (to a place)
- erreke malehila =let's go swimming

=== Numbers ===
- Dooka = One
- Pángi = Two
- Poóse = Three
- Pakái= Four
- Otíni= Five

=== Common nouns ===
- Ochápaká= Man
- Kuríjurí= Woman
- Toji= Sun
- Tlijii= Moon
- Laká= Earth
- Oktara= Stone
- Koora= Tree
- Uu= House

== Bibliography ==
- Constenla Umaña, Adolfo; Sánchez Avendaño, Carlos; Fonseca Marín, Raquel (2023). Diccionario Malecu-Español / Español-malecu (1st ed.). Cartago, Costa Rica: Editorial Tecnologica de Costa Rica. ISBN 978-9977-66-553-5.
- Constenla Umaña, Adolfo (1982). "Sobre la construcción ergativa en la lengua guatusa". Revista de Filología y Lingüística de la Universidad de Costa Rica. 8 (1–2): 97–102. doi:10.15517/rfl.v8i1-2.16122. hdl:10669/14140.
- Constenla Umaña, Adolfo (1983). "Descripción del sistea fonemático del guatuso". Revista de Filología y Lingüística de la Universidad de Costa Rica. 9: 3–20. doi:10.15517/rfl.v9i1.16136. hdl:10669/14132.
- Constenla Umaña, Adolfo (1986). "La voz antipasiva en guatuso". Estudios de Lingüística Chibcha (Universidad de Costa Rica). 5: 86–96.
- Constenla Umaña, Adolfo (1986). Abecedario ilustrado malecu. San José, Costa Rica: Ministerio de Educación Pública.
- Constenla Umaña, Adolfo (1988). "El guatuso de Palenque Margarita: su proceso de declinación". Estudios de Lingüística Chibcha (Universidad de Costa Rica). 7: 7–38.
- Constenla Umaña, Adolfo (1990). "Morfofonología y morfología derivativa guatusas". Estudios de Lingüística Chibcha (Universidad de Costa Rica). 9: 81–122.
- Constenla Umaña, Adolfo (1991). Las lenguas del área intermedia: Introducción a su estudio areal. San José, Costa Rica: Editorial de la Universidad de Costa Rica.
- Constenla Umaña, Adolfo (1998). Gramática de la lengua guatusa. Heredia, Costa Rica: Editorial de la Universidad Nacional.
- Constenla Umaña, Adolfo (2008). "Estado actual de la subclasificación de las lenguas chibchenses y de la reconstrucción fonológica y gramatical del protochibchense". Estudios de Lingüística Chibcha. XXVII. San José, Costa Rica: 117–135.
- Constenla Umaña, Adolfo (2009). FL-3159 Guatuso/Malécu Jaíca I. San José, Costa Rica.
- Constenla Umaña, Adolfo; Castro C., Eustaquio (2011). Pláticas sobre felinos. San José, Costa Rica: Editorial de la Universidad de Costa Rica.
- Constenla Umaña, Adolfo; Castro C., Eustaquio; Blanco R., Antonio (1993). Lacá majifíjicá – La transformación de la tierra. San José, Costa Rica: Editorial de la Universidad de Costa Rica.
- Gordon, Raymond G. Jr. (ed.) (2005). "Ethnologue – Maléku jaíka".
- Krohn, Haakon Stensrud (2011). "La representación sintáctica de la topicalidad de los participantes discursivos en la narrativa tradicional malecu". Estudios de Lingüística Chibcha. 30: 37–62. Archived from the original on 2021-10-24.
- Krohn, Haakon Stensrud (2012). "El mantenimiento de la referencia anafórica en el discurso narrativo tradicional en lengua malecu". Revista de Filología y Lingüística de la Universidad de Costa Rica. 38 (1): 191–216. doi:10.15517/rfl.v38i1.12208. hdl:10669/14498.
- Krohn, Haakon Stensrud (2013). "La función de la orientación al ergativo en el discurso narrativo malecu". Revista de Filología y Lingüística de la Universidad de Costa Rica. 39 (2): 173–190. doi:10.15517/rfl.v39i2.15095. hdl:10669/14541.
- Quesada J., Diego (2007). The Chibchan languages. Cartago, Costa Rica: Editorial Técnica de Costa Rica.
- Quesada Pacheco, Miguel Ángel (2000). "Situación actual y futuro de las lenguas indígenas de Costa Rica". Estudios de Lingüística Chibcha. XVIII–XIX. San José, Costa Rica: 7–34.
- Quilter, Jeffrey; Hoopes, John W. (2003). "Goldwork and Chibchan identity: Endogenous change and diffuse unity in the Isthmo-Colombian area" (PDF). Gold and Power in Ancient Costa Rica, Panama and Colombia: 49–89.
- Sánchez Avendaño, Carlos (2011). "Caracterización cualitativa de la situación sociolingüística del pueblo malecu". Estudios de Lingüística Chibcha (Universidad de Costa Rica). 30: 63–90. Archived from the original on 2021-10-24.
- Sánchez Avendaño, Carlos (2014). "Muerte de lenguas y lenguas en peligro en Costa Rica: la perspectiva exocomunitaria". Revista de Filología y Lingüística de la Universidad de Costa Rica. 40 (1): 173–196. doi:10.15517/rfl.v40i1.16298.
- Sánchez Corrales, Víctor M. (1979). "El maleku: lengua ergativa". Revista de Filología y Lingüística de la Universidad de Costa Rica. 5: 67–71.
- Sánchez Corrales, Víctor M. (1984). "Análisis fonológico del guatuso". Estudios de Lingüística Chibcha (Universidad de Costa Rica). 3: 143–178.
- Smith Sharp, Heidi (1979). "Un análisis fonológico del maleku". Revista de Filología y Lingüística de la Universidad de Costa Rica. 5: 31–54.
- J. Alden Mason, The native languages of Middle America (1940) and The languages of South American Indians (1950)
- Charles Frederick Voegelin, Florence Marie Voegelin, Classification and Index of the World's Languages (1977)
- Adolfo Constenla, Comparative Chibchan Phonology (1981)
- Alfred Marston Tozzer, The Maya and Their Neighbors
