= Naso language =

Chibchan language spoken in Central America

Naso
- Naso
- Teribe
- Native to: Panama, Costa Rica
- Region: In Panama: Naso Tjër Di Comarca, Bocas del Toro Province, Chiriquí Province. In Costa Rica: Limón Province, Puntarenas Province.
- Ethnicity: Naso people
- Native speakers: 500 fluent (2018)
- Language family: Chibchan: Isthmic; Talamanca; Naso
- Dialects: Teribe; Térraba

Language codes
- ISO 639-3: tfr
- Glottolog: teri1250
- ELP: Teribe
- Linguasphere: 81-EAA-a
- Map of the Naso (Teribe) people and language in Panama

Naso, also known as Teribe, is a Chibchan language of the Talamanca subgroup spoken by the Naso (or Teribe) people. It is spoken primarily in the Naso Tjër Di Comarca and the Bocas del Toro Province of northwestern Panama, with some speakers present in the Limón Province of Costa Rica as well. In the southern part of Costa Rica's Puntarenas Province, a handful of speakers are also present. It is part of the Chibchan language family. There are fewer than 1,000 speakers as of 2018, of which only 500 are fluent, nearly all of whom speak Spanish as well.

== Name ==
The Naso people refer to their language as Naso. Many sources also use the term Teribe, which likely derives from a common root to Tjër Di, which refers to the river that runs through the eponymous territory. This term is used specifically in reference to that region and its dialect. Another dialect, Térraba, refers to the language as spoken in Térraba, Costa Rica, which is endonymously known as Brörán̈.

== History ==
The Teribe people were very difficult for the Spaniards to conquer, taking nearly 130 years for them to surrender. This was made possible by the relocation of a Teribe clan, the Térrabas, to modern-day Costa Rica in 1695, who were seemingly favored towards Christianization. Following this, the Teribes of Panama and the Térrabas eventually lost contact; oral tradition maintains that a group of Teribes were lost attempting to cross over to the Pacific. This event led to a significant turning point for the Teribe language. Throughout the 19th and 20th centuries, the Térrabas gradually assimilated into greater Costa Rican culture, necessitating the death of the Teribe language there. By 2000, only three fluent speakers and "half a dozen" semispeakers remained of the language among the Térrabas.

== Status ==
As elucidated above, the status of the Naso language among the Térrabas of Costa Rica is one of near language death. The general attitude towards the language was described by Juan Diego Quesada (2000) as one of "neglect", and that "the will [wa]s simply not there" to revitalize the Teribe language there. In contrast, the Teribes of Panama have preserved the language to a much greater extent, due to their isolation from the rest of the country, with 3,000 speakers of the language among them. Indeed, in the primary villages of Sieyic and Sieyking, the language still serves as a "symbol of cultural identity", and bilignualism with Spanish is healthy, whereas in other villages, Naso has been completely displaced and is no longer spoken there. However, there are a number of signs that the language is threatened even in the larger villages; for instance, only Spanish is taught in schools, and many young people in Teribe communities move out of the language environment. The Teribe have a clear language policy, in that any linguists must obtain a permit from the king, and distribute any published works to the community, but it does not actually guarantee the survival of the language. As of 2018, "the vast majority of [Naso] children" do not speak Teribe.

== Classification ==
Naso is a Chibchan language. It belongs to the Western branch of the Isthmic languages according to Adolfo Constenla Umaña (2012).

== Phonology ==
Naso has 23 consonantal and 13 vocalic phonemes.

=== Consonants ===
Naso consonants
		Bilabial		Dento-alveolar		Alveopalatal	Velar		Glottal
		plain	aspirated	plain	aspirated	Alveopalatal	plain	aspirated	Glottal
Stop	voiceless	p	pʰ	t	tʰ		k	kʰ	
Stop	voiced	b		d			g		
Fricative	voiceless			s		ʃ			h
Fricative	voiced			z		ʒ			
Affricate						tʃ			
Nasal		m		n		ɲ	ŋ		
Lateral flap				ɺ					
Trill				r					
Glide		w				j			

=== Vowels ===
Naso vowels
		Front		Central		Back	
		oral	nasal	oral	nasal	oral	nasal
High	tense	i	ĩ			u	ũ
High	lax	ɪ				ʊ	
Mid		e	ẽ			o	õ
Low				a	ã	ɑ	

== Writing system ==
Teribe alphabet (Panama)
a	ã	ä	b	ch	d	e	ẽ	ë	g	gw	i	ĩ	j	k	kw	l
ll	m	n	ñ	o	õ	ö	p	r	s	sh	t	u	ũ	w	y	z

Teribe also uses the ll with diaeresis centered over the letters.

== Morphology ==
=== Nouns ===
==== Numeral classifiers ====
Similarly to other Chibchan languages of the region, Naso uses a system of numeral classifiers, which can be numeral, interrogative, or indefinite. There are six classes of classifiers, animate objects, including humans, certain animals, and some body parts, round objects, wide objects, long and wide objects, and objects countable in plots.

== Sources ==
- Gamarra A., Enrique; Villagra S., Inocencio (1980). Llëbo ñaglo lok kibokwogo ëre e lanyo = Vocabulario ilustrado teribe-español (in Teribe and Spanish). Instituto Nacional de Cultura & Instituto Lingüístico de Verano.
