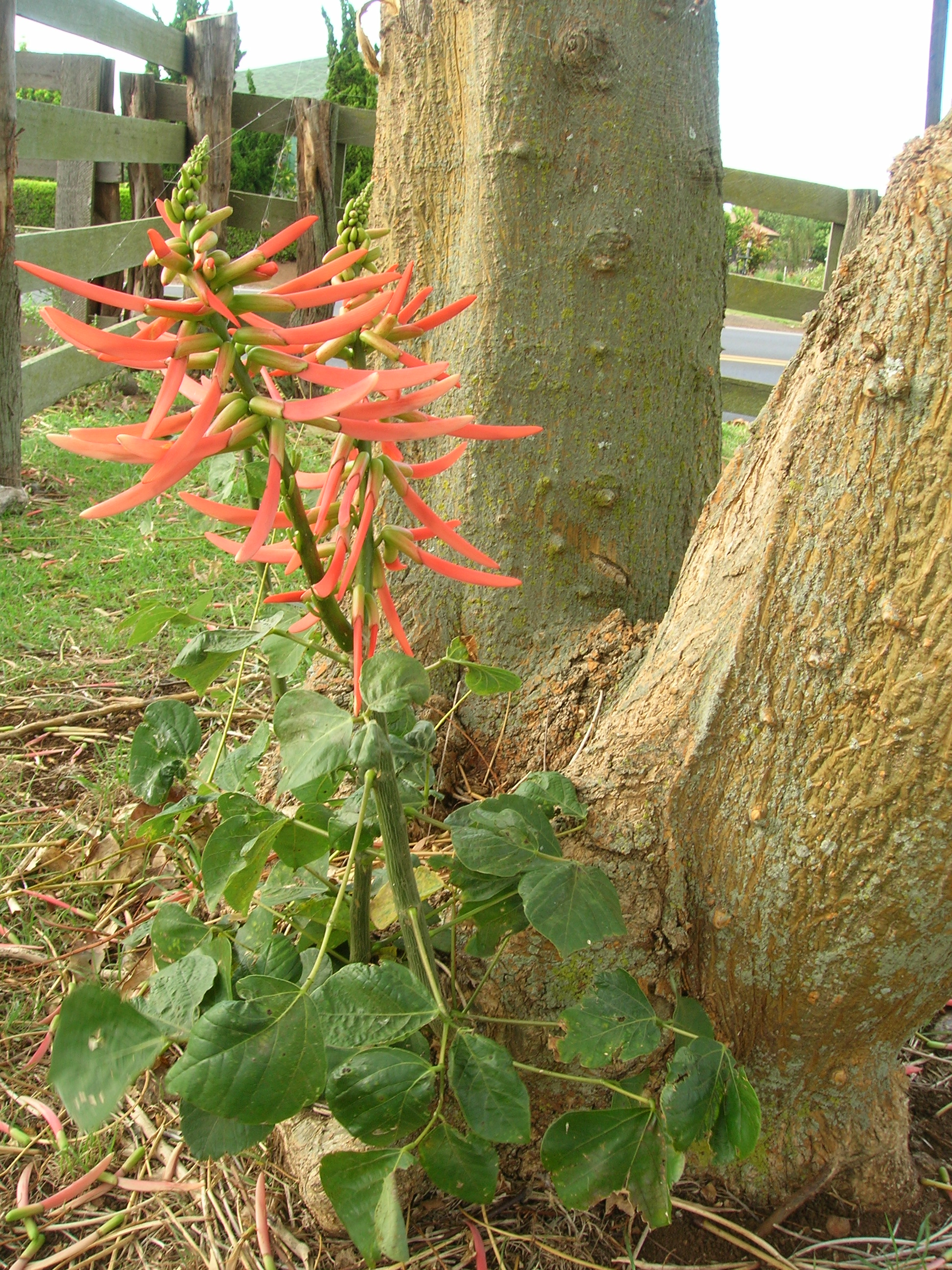

Scientific classification
- Kingdom: Plantae
- Clade: Tracheophytes
- Clade: Angiosperms
- Clade: Eudicots
- Clade: Rosids
- Order: Fabales
- Family: Fabaceae
- Subfamily: Faboideae
- Genus: Erythrina
- Species: E. berteroana

Binomial name
- Erythrina berteroana Urb.

= Erythrina berteroana =

Species of legume

Erythrina berteroana is a species of small deciduous tree in the family Fabaceae. It is found in Mexico, Central America and the northern part of South America. Common names include elequeme, gallito, machete, pernila de casa, pito and poró de cerca. It is a common tree in the drier parts of its range and has many traditional uses.

== Description ==
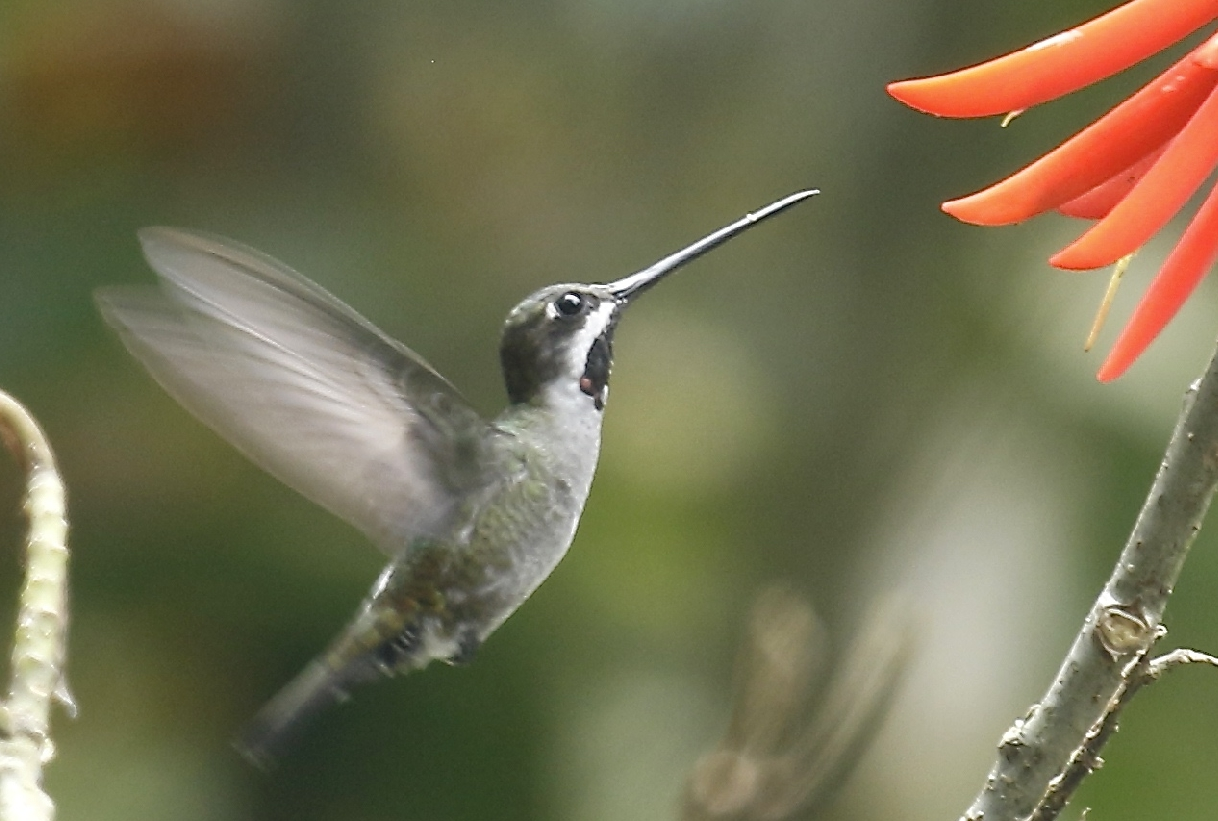
Long-billed starthroat

A small deciduous tree growing to a height of 12 to 15 m (40 to 50 ft), E. berteroana has a maximum diameter of 20 cm (8 in) at chest height. The branches are smooth and thorny. The leaves are alternate, borne on petioles up to 15 cm (6 in) long, are trifoliate, each leaflet being ovate or rhomboidal, up to 20 cm (8 in) wide and 17 cm (7 in) long, with acuminate apexes and cuneate bases. The inflorescence, up to 50 cm (20 in) long, is terminal and is of the raceme type. The flowers are pink or red, appearing at the same time as the leaves. They are large and tubular, each with a banner, wings and keels, nine stamens bunched together and one free, and a long pistil. They are followed by curling, woody pods up to 30 cm (12 in) long, containing several bean-like seeds. The tree usually blooms from December to March, with pollination being performed by hummingbirds, usually by long-billed starthroats (Heliomaster longirostris).

== Distribution and habitat ==
Erythrina berteroana is native to southern Mexico, Central America, Guatemala and Venezuela. It grows at altitudes of up to 1,800 m (6,000 ft) in areas where the annual precipitation is between 1,500 and 4,000 mm (60 and 160 in). It prefers acidic soils (to pH 4) and tolerates high levels of aluminium in the soil. It flourishes in a range of temperatures and is probably frost resistant.

== Uses ==
Probably the most common lowland tree in the drier parts of Central America, it has many uses. The shoots and unopened flowers are cooked as a vegetable, and the young foliage is used as fodder for cattle. Cut branches are thrust into the ground to take root and grow into living fencing posts. The roots have nitrogen-fixing nodules which enrich the soil. The tree provides shade in coffee plantations and is used as living stakes for growing yams and chayote. The leaves make a useful mulch. The bark and seeds contain toxic alkaloids and can be used to prepare a poison. The timber is lightweight and coarse, but can be carved into objects and used like cork. A yellow dye can be extracted from the bark, and the flowers, leaves and bark are used in traditional medicine.
