= Maleku people =

Costa Rican Indigenous people

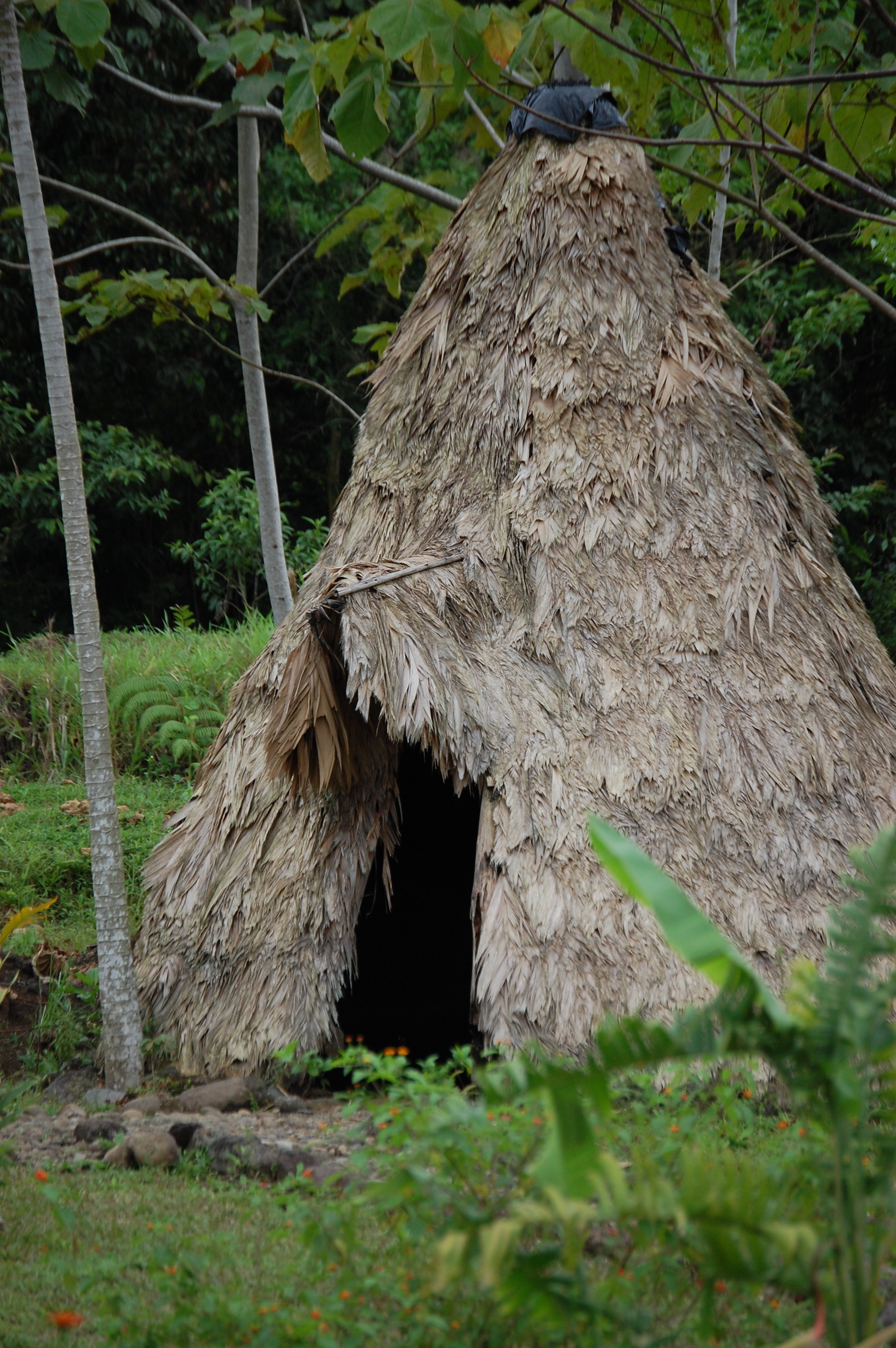
Traditional grass hut in a Maleku outpost near La Fortuna, Costa Rica.

The Maleku are an Indigenous people of Costa Rica located in the Guatuso Indigenous Reserve near the town of Guatuso (San Rafael de Guatuso). Historically they were also known as the Guatuso, the name used by Spanish settlers. Around 600 Aboriginal people live on the reserve, making this the smallest tribe in Costa Rica, but outsiders have come into the community as well. Before the Spanish settlement, their territory extended as far west as Rincon de la Vieja, and included the volcano Arenal to the south and Rio Celeste as sacred sites. Today their reserve is concentrated south of San Rafael de Guatuso, an hour north of La Fortuna.

== History ==
The Maleku historically lived in the Río Frío watershed on a geographic span of 2,500 square miles. They remained undiscovered until 1750, with the arrival of Spanish settlers. Between 1868 and 1900, Nicaraguan rubber farmers migrated onto Maleku territory, often in armed bands, claiming traditional Maleku territories. The resulting death, enslavement, and dislocation of the Maleku eventually ended due to the influence of Catholic missionaries, in particular Bishop Bernardo Augusto Thiel. Thiel's mission to "civilize" and "Christianize" the Maleku coexisted with a desire to end the enslavement and genocide of such Indigenous populations. He provided the Maleku with tools and firearms while encouraging the development of European farming practices and lobbied the government to punish citizens who captured indigenous people. In addition, he assigned people and places Spanish names despite knowing the Maleku terms. Western tools, standards of dress, and economic systems like commercial farming were impressed upon the Maleku as they were other Indigenous populations in the Americas. However, the Christian tradition did not surpass traditional Maleku beliefs due to the lack of a permanent mission and the language barrier. However, the violent incursion, cultural and economic imposition, and diseases like malaria did decrease the pre-contact population of 6,000 to its current 600-member count.

The 1911 Encyclopædia Britannica describes them as an active, hardy people, who have always maintained hostility towards the Spaniards and retain their independence. They were described by old writers as being very fair, with flaxen hair, and these reports led to a belief, since exploded, that they were European hybrids. As of 1911, there were very few surviving.

== Culture ==
Maleku society was traditionally egalitarian, with little internal stratification, and featured gendered division of labor. Their religion is polytheistic and oriented toward nature. Many aspects of Maleku culture are still practiced today, as seen in the production of traditional art for economic subsistence. Their culture is also shared with visitors through the tours they offer, which include cultural information like history, diet, and the reforestation program and ideology. While the presence of Catholic missionaries was protective in the era of Spanish settlement, the terms of engagement did not remain economic and included the partial loss of cultural practices. However, in 2016, linguist Carlos Sánchez Avendaño created dictionaries for three Costa Rican tribes including the Maleku in order to promote cultural retention among Indigenous youth. These dictionaries cover specific subjects like the wildlife prioritized by each tribe and recipes as well as the language as a whole and are meant to be publicly available as well. In addition, the work goes beyond translation to portray the cultural perspective, for example including bats and insects as flying animals in the Maleku animal dictionary.

The Maleku no longer live in their traditional houses, since the trees necessary to make them are now endangered, nor do they wear their traditional clothes. Today the villages mostly contain cement houses but still contain several traditional houses used for ceremonies as tourist attractions. The Maleku traditionally bury their dead directly inside their homes, so the dead are never forgotten. Living in cement houses, the Maleku have had to acquire special permission from the Costa Rican government to bury their dead in their backyards. (See Gautusa mythology for more information on religious beliefs.) In addition, aside from those made for the tourism industry, traditional clay pots have been largely replaced by aluminum ones.

=== Diet ===
Their traditional diet consisted of various plants and animals from the tropical forests. Animal sources include a wide variety of fish, and turtles, from the Rio Frio, Rio Sol, and Caño Negro. The Maleku continue to hunt for iguana meat and use the skin on their traditional drums. Turtles are particularly culturally significant as codified in the annual rite of communal turtle hunting. Some plants, while mildly toxic, are still part of a traditional Maleku diet. Medicinal plants are also important to the Maleku, particularly given their rural location and distance from mainstream medical centers. Various types of chicha, for example banana and cassava, are consumed to connote amity at social gatherings, at celebrations, and in exchanges.

Certain animals are specifically not consumed despite being native to the land. Wild or domestic animals with horns, like cows and deer, are religiously proscribed, as are howler and capuchin monkeys.

=== Reserve ===
The reserve consists of 3 "palenques" or villages, Palenque Sol, Palenque Tonjibe, and Palenque Margarita. These palenques meet several times a year in social and celebratory gatherings; historically, they would also unite militarily against external threats. The reserve contains two elementary schools that teach the Maleku language (a Chibchan language) and culture.

The Maleku reserve is actually limited to 15% of the territory granted to them by the Costa Rican government with the foundation of the reservation in 1976. Thus, of 11.5 square miles legally considered reserve lands, the Maleku own less than 2 square miles. While the land legally belongs to the Maleku, this is not enforced; the majority remains unreturned, having been sold or traded to non-Indigenous people before this time in uneven exchanges. Due to this appropriation of Maleku lands, 62% of residents in the legally designated Maleku reserve currently are non-Maleku. Some Maleku have therefore begun to illegally occupy lands they consider theirs. One man claims foreigners should by their T-shirts and other knick knacks because Maleku can provide oxygen to the world by planting. Meanwhile, dams, plumbing systems, and other governmental projects threaten Indigenous control of water as a resource and sacred substance.

=== Economy ===
As with many other Costa Rican Indigenous populations, the Maleku today rely on the tourism industry for economic survival. They invite tourists to visit and tour their villages, although most tourists prefer to see them perform ceremonies in traditional palm clothing in the nearby town of La Fortuna. Tourists who visit the villages, however, get a better sense of Maleku culture, even if it is somewhat diminished in modern times. One can visit the traditional gardens of healing plants and admire animals that still inhabit the forest, including toucans, frogs, and monkeys.

In addition to tours, the Maleku also create Indigenous art to sell; carvings, paintings of wooden masks and jucara (bowls made from gourds), and musical instruments are their most popular items. Such products preserve the cultural history of the Maleku and emphasize the sacredness of the land and animals, and the wooden masks in particular use only debris from surrounding trees rather than the destruction of live ones. These are sold to tourists in the villages or taken to cities like San Jose to be sold there. Most members in the villages (including children) make some type of art or help out, by cutting and preparing the necessary balsa wood trees or fruit needed for the projects. Additionally, many adults leave the reservation to work elsewhere periodically or to relocate permanently. The Maleku's rate of unemployment, at 10%, is the highest of any Costa Rican Indigenous community; self-sustainability is further compromised by the small territory, which preempts their traditional reliance on hunting and fishing.

=== Animal Symbolism ===
In Maleku history, animals have always maintained an especially sacred part of their lives alongside nature. As a result, the Maleku people have assigned certain symbolic characteristics to some of the animals found in Costa Rica. These symbolic characteristics are in accordance to the behaviors and characteristics of these animals in the wild, as well as their role in some of their traditional stories that make up Maleku history. The following are just a few of what can be found in their artwork:

- Jaguar - A fierce and wise leader that is passionate about nature. Sometimes mischievous.
- Scarlet Macaw - Fidelity and good matrimony.
- Morpho Butterfly - Peace, love, and good luck.
- Snake - Represents the Shaman of the tribe. Someone who takes care of others through medicinal knowledge.
- Owl - Wise and able to see beyond darkness.
- Toucan - The interior and exterior beauty of the woman.

== Politics ==
In January 2012, the Maleku Tribal Council received national recognition as a registered governing body. This group oversees reforestation of Native lands, and its legal status allows it to apply for grants for community projects. For example, the rancho, a building used for Council meetings and traditional ceremonies, had deteriorated over time and caught on fire, prompting a call for restoration; this effort reached full funding in 2013. More controversially, a group of Maleku began an occupation of a private estate within the reserve on December 10, 2012. The occupation lasted three months. However, it does not appear to have had reaching effects on the historic and continued appropriation of Maleku lands.

In 2013, Jeffrey López wrote and directed a short documentary, Toro Hami (Caño Negro in the Maleku language), about the Maleku. Only fifteen minutes long and in both Spanish and Maleku, the video engages with two Maleku elders about the cultural practices of and current obstacles faced by their people. Two main outside forces are described: the government and private interests. In particular, the federally managed Caño Negro Wildlife Refuge, established in 1984, restricts Indigenous use of the wetlands, traditionally a major food source for the Maleku. Not only does this complicate access to food, but fishing also has a cultural significance for the Maleku: according to the Maleku religion, one punishment for those who misbehave is to have "fragile fishing nets," corroborating the social and cultural importance of fishing. Meanwhile, transnational industries like pineapple companies and local ranchers are seen to be destroying nature, in conflict with Maleku philosophy which prioritizes environmental stability and the sacred importance of water. The Maleku elders describe the loss of food animals and their inability to navigate production negotiations with such parties as major problems posed by the modern world.

== Language ==
70% of the tribe speaks the Maleku language.
