= Boruca language =

Chibchan language spoken in Costa Rica

Boruca
- Bronca, Bronka, Brunca
- Brúnkajk
- Native to: Costa Rica
- Ethnicity: 1,000 Boruca people (1991)
- Extinct: 2013; April 2018, with the death of Nemesio González (last semispeaker)
- Revival: Taught in schools
- Language family: Chibchan: Isthmic; Talamanca; Boruca

Language codes
- ISO 639-3: brn
- Glottolog: boru1252 Boruca quep1238 Quepo
- ELP: Boruca
- Linguasphere: 81-EBA-aa

Boruca (Boruca: Brúnkajk; also known as Bronka, Bronca, Brunca) is the native language of the Boruca people of Costa Rica. Boruca belongs to the Isthmian branch of the Chibchan languages. Though exact speaker numbers are uncertain, UNESCO's Atlas of the World's Languages in Danger has listed Boruca as "critically endangered". It was spoken fluently by only five women in 1986, while 30 to 35 others spoke it non-fluently. The rest of the tribe's 1,000 members speak Spanish.

Boruca is taught as a second language at the local primary school Escuela Doris Z. Stone. One can hear Bronka words and phrases mixed into Spanish conversations but it is extremely rare to hear prolonged exchanges in Bronka.

== Grammar ==
The personal pronouns in Boruca (the ᵛ represents a glottal stop.)

Person	Singular	Plural
1st	át	diᵛ / diᵛ rójc
2nd	bá	biᵛ / biᵛ rójc
3rd	i	i rójc / iᵛ rójc

The numbers (the "n̈", "n" with the diaeresis "¨" on top may be unavailable in some fonts, it represents a slightly different sound from the normal n or ñ.)

Numbers	Boruca
1	éᵛxe, éᵛxi
2	búᵛc
3	man̈
4	bájcan̈
5	shishcán̈
6	téshan
7	cúj, cújc
8	éjtan̈
9	cújtan̈, éjcuj
10	téjcuj, cróshtan̈, búᵛc cúj

== Greetings ==
¿Ishójcre rában? 'What's up?'
Morén, morén. 'Fine, well.'

== See also ==
- Brunca Sign Language

== Bibliography ==
- Quesada Pacheco, Miguel Ángel (1995). Hablemos Boruca. (in Spanish and Boruca). San José, Costa Rica: Ministerio de Educación Pública. p. 33. ISBN 9977-60-114-3.
