= Huetar language =

Extinct Chibchan language of Costa Rica

Huetar
- Güetar
- Native to: Costa Rica
- Ethnicity: Huetar people
- Extinct: early 20th century
- Language family: Chibchan: Votic; Huetar

Language codes
- ISO 639-3: None (mis)
- Glottolog: huet1235
- Linguasphere: 81-DAA-ab

Huetar (Güetar) is an extinct Chibchan language of Costa Rica that was spoken by the Huetar people. It served as the lingua franca for precolonial peoples in central Costa Rica, and went extinct in the 17th century. Only a few words in the language are currently known, preserved mainly in the names of various Costa Rican places, such as Aserrí, Barva, Curridabat, Turrialba, Tucurrique, and Ujarrás.

The main source of studies regarding the language is the Costa Rican linguist Miguel Ángel Quesada Pacheco.

== Bibliography ==
- Quesada Pacheco, Miguel Ángel (1996). Los huetares: Historia, etnografía y tradición oral. Editorial Tecnológica de Costa Rica. ISBN 978-9977-66-070-7.
