= Cabécar language =

Chibchan language spoken in Costa Rica

Cabécar
- Native to: Costa Rica
- Region: Turrialba Region (Cartago Province)
- Ethnicity: Cabécar people 13,000 (2011 census)
- Native speakers: 11,000 (2011); 2,000 monolingual (2015)
- Language family: Chibchan: Isthmic; Talamanca; Viceitic; Cabécar
- Writing system: Latin

Language codes
- ISO 639-3: cjp
- Glottolog: cabe1245
- ELP: Cabécar
- Linguasphere: 81-EBB-aa

The Cabécar language is an indigenous American language of the Chibchan language family spoken by the Cabécar people in the inland Turrialba Region, Cartago Province, Costa Rica. As of 2007, 2,000 speakers were monolingual. It is the only indigenous language in Costa Rica with monolingual adults. The language is also known by its dialect names Chirripó, Estrella, Telire, and Ujarrás.

== History ==
Cabécar is considered to be one of a few "Chibcha-speaking tribes", categorized by similarities in the languages that they speak. Other Chibcha speaking tribes include the Bribri and the Boruca, also of Costa Rica. It is believed that the languages of the Chibcha speaking tribes shared a common ancestor around 8,000 years ago. However, differences in the languages are thought to have come about from the influence of outside people, including influences from Mesoamerica.

== Geographic distribution ==
Cabécar is an endangered language spoken in Costa Rica. It is spoken by the Cabécar people, an indigenous group located near the Talamancan mountains of Costa Rica.

=== Dialects and varieties ===
There are two different dialects of Cabécar, each of which has more narrow dialects within it. One of these is spoken in the north, while the other is spoken in southern parts of Costa Rica.

== Phonology ==
Cabécar uses a Latin alphabet with umlauts for (ë, ö), and tildes for (ã, ẽ, ĩ, õ, ũ). Cabécar has twelve vowels, five of which are nasalized.

=== Consonants ===
		Bilabial	Dental	Alveolar	Retroflex	Postalveolar	Velar	Glottal
Plosive	plain	p ⟨p⟩		t ⟨t⟩		t͡ʃ ⟨ch⟩	k ⟨k⟩	
Plosive	voiced	b ⟨b⟩		d ⟨d⟩		d͡ʒ ⟨y⟩		
Fricative				s ⟨s⟩		ʃ ⟨sh⟩		h ⟨j⟩
Affricate			t͡k ⟨tk⟩	t͡s ⟨ts⟩				
Flap					ɽ ⟨r⟩			
Nasal							ŋ ⟨n̈⟩	

=== Vowels ===
Vowels
		Front	Central	Back
High	oral	i ⟨i⟩		u ⟨u⟩
High	nasal	ĩ ⟨i̱⟩		ũ ⟨u̱⟩
Near-high		ɪ ⟨ë⟩		ʊ ⟨ö⟩
Mid-high	oral	e ⟨e⟩		o ⟨o⟩
Mid-high	nasal	ẽ ⟨e̱⟩		õ ⟨o̱⟩
Low	oral		a ⟨a⟩	
Low	nasal		ã ⟨a̱⟩	

== Grammar ==
Cabécar has a canonical word order of subject–object–verb.

== Resources ==
- Anderson, W. D. (2006). "Medical Education: What Would the Shamans and Witches Think?". Academic Medicine. 81 (10): 138–143. doi:10.1097/00001888-200610001-00033. PMID 17001125.
- Cervantes Gamboa, Laura (1991). "Observaciones etnomusicológicas acerca de tres cantos de cuna cabécares". Estudios de Lingüística Chibcha. 10: 143–163.
- Constenla Umaña, Adolfo (2012). "Chibchan languages". In Campbell, Lyle; Grondona, Verónica (eds.). The indigenous languages of South America: A comprehensive guide. WOL. Vol. 2. pp. 391–440. doi:10.1515/9783110258035. hdl:1887/70116. ISBN 978-3-11-025513-3.
- Gavarrete, M. E. (2015). "The challenges of mathematics education for Indigenous teacher training". Intercultural Education. 26 (4): 326–337. doi:10.1080/14675986.2015.1073878. hdl:11056/17793.
- González Campos, G. (2015). "Nuevas consideraciones sobre la morfología verbal del cabécar". LETRAS. 1 (51): 33–58.
- Instituto Clodomiro Picado (2009). Tkäbe tso Costa Rica ska Tkäbe te sa shkawe wätkewaklä (serpientes de Costa Rica y prevención de mordeduras). San José: Instituto Clodomiro Picado.
- Lamounier Ferreira, A. (2013). "¿En cabécar o español?: bilingüismo y diglosia en Alto Chirripó". Cuadernos Intercambio sobre Centroamérica y el Caribe. 10 (12). Centro de Investigación e Identidad y Cultura Latinoamericana, Universidad de Costa Rica: 105–119.
- Margery Peña, Enrique (2003) [1989]. Diccionario Cabécar-Español, Español-Cabécar. Editorial de la Universidad de Costa Rica.
- Potter, Elsa (1998). The primary education of bilingual indigenous children on the Talamanca Bribri Reservation in Limón Province of Costa Rica (Thesis). Kingsville: Texas A&M University.
- Quesada, Diego J. (2000). "On Language Contact: Another Look at Spanish-speaking (Central) America". Hispanic Research Journal. 1 (3): 229–242. doi:10.1179/hrj.2000.1.3.229.
- Quesada, Juan Diego (2007). The Chibchan Languages. Cartago, Costa Rica: Editorial Tecnologica de CR. ISBN 9789977661865. OCLC 176106827.
- Quesada Pacheco, Miguel Ángel (2013). "Estado de la lengua cabécar en el poblado de San Rafael de Cañas, Buenos Aires (Puntarenas)". Estudios de Lingüística Chibcha. 32: 153–207.
- Solórzano, S. F. (2010). "Teclado chibcha: un software lingüístico para los sistemas de escritura de las lenguas bribri y cabécar". Revista de Filología y Lingüística de la Universidad de Costa Rica. 36 (2).
- Verhoeven, Elisabeth (2012). "Cabécar – a Chibchan language of Costa Rica". In Sakel, Jeanette; Stolz, Thomas (eds.). Amerindiana: Neue Perspektiven auf die indigenen Sprachen Amerikas. Berlin: Akademie. pp. 151–169. doi:10.1524/9783050057682.151. ISBN 978-3-050-05768-2.
- Pozas Arciniega, Ricardo (1996). Margery Peña, Enrique (ed.). Yis ma̱ i shö (yo voy a decir). Illustrations by Francisco Amighetti. Costa Rica: Ministerio de Educación Pública. ISBN 9977-60-122-4.
