= Demographics of Panama =

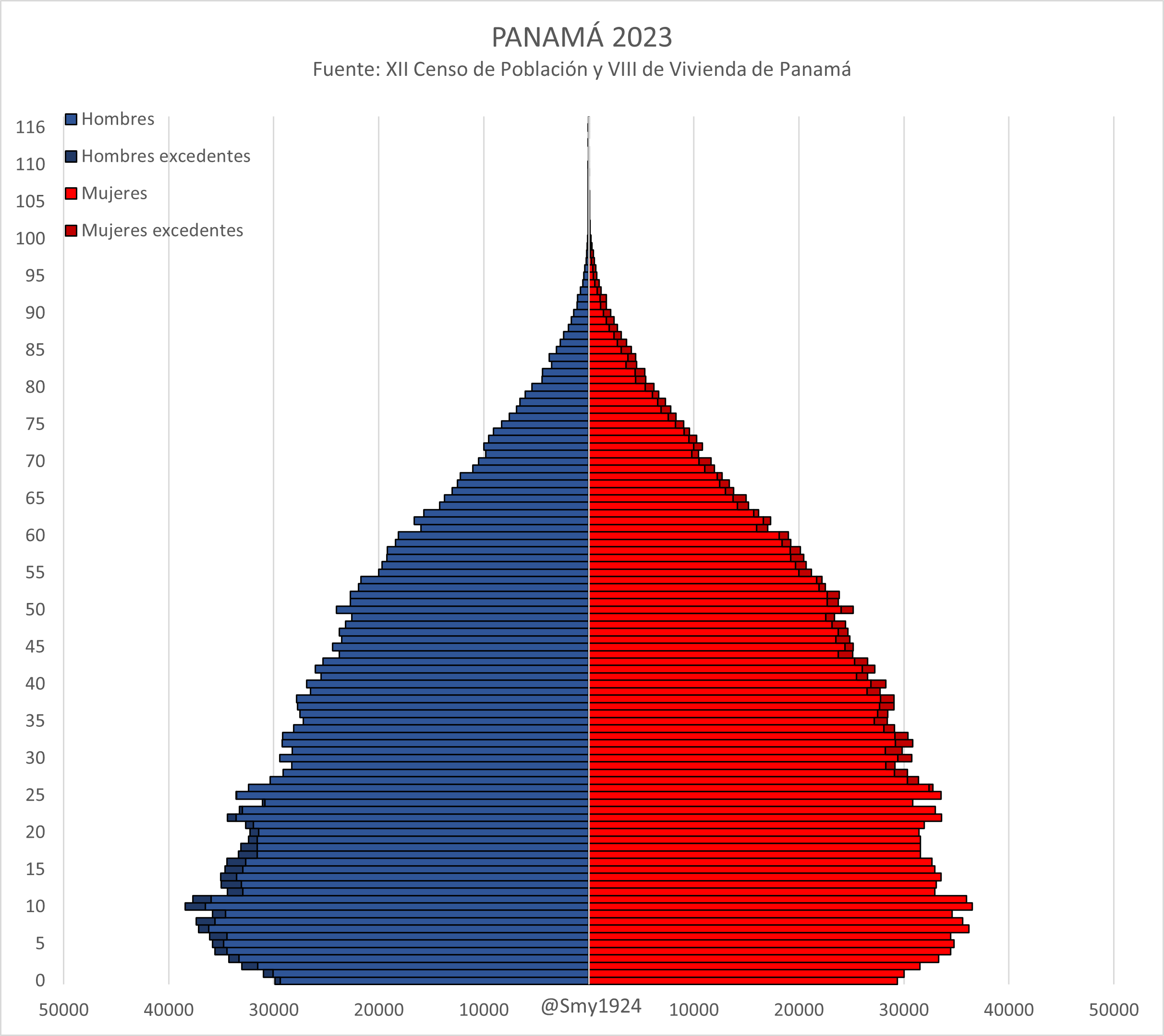
- Population pyramid of Panama in 2023
- Population: 4,337,768 (2022 est.)
- Growth rate: 1.09% (2025)
- Birth rate: 12.04 births/1,000 population (2025)
- Death rate: 4.29 deaths/1,000 population (2025)
- Life expectancy: 77.62 years
  - male: 74.76 years
  - female: 80.66 years
- Fertility rate: 1.79 children per woman (2024)
- Infant mortality: 16.44 deaths/1,000 live births
- Net migration rate: 3.42 migrant(s)/1,000 population
- Immigrant share: 10.6% (2024)

Age structure
- 0–14 years: 25.41%
- 15–64 years: 64.79%
- 65 and over: 9.80%

Nationality
- Nationality: Panamanian
- Major ethnic: Mestizo - 51.2%
- Minor ethnic: Black - 31.7% Indigenous - 17.2%

Language
- Official: Spanish

This is a demography of the population of Panama including population density, ethnicity, education level, health of the populace, economic status, religious affiliations, and other aspects of the population. Panama's 2020 census has been postponed due to the COVID-19 pandemic but the government are currently assessing additional implications. They are evaluating the preparatory processes that can begin now, such as procurement.

== Population size and structure ==
Census population and growth rate
| Year | Pop. | ±% p.a. |
|---|---|---|
| 1911 | 336,742 | — |
| 1920 | 446,098 | +3.17% |
| 1930 | 467,459 | +0.47% |
| 1940 | 622,576 | +2.91% |
| 1950 | 805,285 | +2.61% |
| 1960 | 1,075,541 | +2.94% |
| 1970 | 1,428,082 | +2.88% |
| 1980 | 1,805,287 | +2.37% |
| 1990 | 2,329,329 | +2.58% |
| 2000 | 2,839,177 | +2.00% |
| 2010 | 3,405,813 | +1.84% |
| 2023 | 4,064,780 | +1.37% |

Panama's population was 4,351,267 people in 2021, compared to 860,000 in 1950. The proportion of the population aged below 15 in 2010 was 29%. 64.5% of the population were aged between 15 and 65, with 6.6% of the population being 65 years or older.

View source data.
View source data.

=== Structure of the population ===
| | Total population (x 1000) | Proportion aged 0–14 (%) | Proportion aged 15–64 (%) | Proportion aged 65+ (%) |
|---|---|---|---|---|
| 1950 | 860 | 40.2 | 55.7 | 4.1 |
| 1955 | 983 | 41.8 | 54.1 | 4.1 |
| 1960 | 1 136 | 42.9 | 52.8 | 4.3 |
| 1965 | 1 319 | 43.8 | 51.8 | 4.4 |
| 1970 | 1 526 | 43.9 | 51.8 | 4.3 |
| 1975 | 1 754 | 42.8 | 52.8 | 4.4 |
| 1980 | 1 990 | 40.4 | 55.0 | 4.6 |
| 1985 | 2 233 | 37.6 | 57.6 | 4.7 |
| 1990 | 2 487 | 35.2 | 59.9 | 5.0 |
| 1995 | 2 757 | 33.3 | 61.5 | 5.2 |
| 2000 | 3 055 | 31.8 | 62.6 | 5.5 |
| 2005 | 3 366 | 30.4 | 63.7 | 5.9 |
| 2010 | 3 678 | 29.0 | 64.5 | 6.6 |
| 2015 | 4 080 | 28.1 | 64.6 | 7.3 |

Population Estimates by Sex and Age Group (01.VII.2013) (Data refer to projections based on the 2010 Population Census.):

| Age group | Male | Female | Total | % |
|---|---|---|---|---|
| Total | 1 934 264 | 1 916 471 | 3 850 735 | 100 |
| 0-4 | 187 797 | 179 822 | 367 619 | 9.55 |
| 5-9 | 184 487 | 176 909 | 361 396 | 9.39 |
| 10-14 | 180 579 | 173 379 | 353 958 | 9,19 |
| 15-19 | 170 895 | 164 639 | 335 534 | 8,71 |
| 20-24 | 160 414 | 155 878 | 316 292 | 8.21 |
| 25-29 | 154 493 | 150 986 | 305 479 | 7.93 |
| 30-34 | 147 618 | 144 488 | 292 106 | 7.59 |
| 35-39 | 140 942 | 138 936 | 279 878 | 7.27 |
| 40-44 | 130 725 | 130 042 | 260 767 | 6.77 |
| 45-49 | 113 877 | 114 213 | 228 090 | 5.92 |
| 50-54 | 96 564 | 98 076 | 194 640 | 5.05 |
| 55-59 | 76 084 | 78 641 | 154 725 | 4.02 |
| 60-64 | 58 974 | 62 105 | 121 079 | 3.14 |
| 65-69 | 45 360 | 48 700 | 94 060 | 2.44 |
| 70-74 | 33 839 | 37 313 | 71 152 | 1.85 |
| 75-79 | 23 622 | 27 020 | 50 642 | 1.32 |
| 80-84 | 14 944 | 17 956 | 32 900 | 0.85 |
| 85-89 | 8 174 | 10 458 | 18 632 | 0.48 |
| 90-94 | 3 573 | 4 938 | 8 511 | 0,22 |
| 95-99 | 1 119 | 1 678 | 2 797 | 0.07 |
| 100+ | 184 | 294 | 478 | 0.01 |
| Age group | Male | Female | Total | Percent |
| 0-14 | 552 863 | 530 110 | 1 082 973 | 28.12 |
| 15-64 | 1 250 586 | 1 238 004 | 2 488 590 | 64.63 |
| 65+ | 130 815 | 148 357 | 279 172 | 7.25 |

Population Estimates by Sex and Age Group (01.VII.2021) (Data based on the 2010 Population Census.):

| Age group | Male | Female | Total | % |
|---|---|---|---|---|
| Total | 2 173 761 | 2 163 645 | 4 337 406 | 100 |
| 0–4 | 188 707 | 180 605 | 369 312 | 8.51 |
| 5–9 | 188 786 | 180 836 | 369 622 | 8.52 |
| 10–14 | 186 177 | 178 516 | 364 693 | 8.41 |
| 15–19 | 184 931 | 177 805 | 362 736 | 8.36 |
| 20–24 | 179 023 | 173 354 | 352 377 | 8.12 |
| 25–29 | 166 836 | 163 323 | 330 159 | 7.61 |
| 30–34 | 158 793 | 156 785 | 315 578 | 7.28 |
| 35–39 | 152 777 | 150 905 | 303 682 | 7.00 |
| 40–44 | 145 734 | 144 050 | 289 784 | 6.68 |
| 45–49 | 136 697 | 136 413 | 273 110 | 6.30 |
| 50–54 | 121 428 | 122 735 | 244 163 | 5.63 |
| 55–59 | 102 281 | 105 070 | 207 351 | 4.78 |
| 60–64 | 82 346 | 86 597 | 168 943 | 3.90 |
| 65-69 | 61 869 | 67 091 | 128 960 | 2.97 |
| 70-74 | 45 329 | 50 809 | 96 138 | 2.22 |
| 75-79 | 31 963 | 37 293 | 69 256 | 1.60 |
| 80-84 | 20 693 | 25 375 | 46 068 | 1.06 |
| 85-89 | 11 689 | 15 209 | 26 898 | 0.62 |
| 90-94 | 5 433 | 7 528 | 12 961 | 0.30 |
| 95-99 | 1 894 | 2 777 | 4 671 | 0.11 |
| 100+ | 375 | 569 | 944 | 0.02 |
| Age group | Male | Female | Total | Percent |
| 0–14 | 563 670 | 539 957 | 1 103 627 | 25.44 |
| 15–64 | 1 430 846 | 1 417 037 | 2 847 883 | 65.66 |
| 65+ | 179 245 | 206 651 | 385 896 | 8.90 |

=== 2020 Statistics ===
Population Distribution (2016 vs 2020)
| Age Group | Year | % | Change |
| 85+ | 2016 | 0.88% | 0.13 |
| 85+ | 2020 | 1.01% | 0.13 |
| 80-84 | 2016 | 0.92% | 0.11 |
| 80-84 | 2020 | 1.03% | 0.11 |
| 75-80 | 2016 | 1.41% | 0.15 |
| 75-80 | 2020 | 1.56% | 0.15 |
| 70-75 | 2016 | 1.97% | 0.19 |
| 70-75 | 2020 | 2.16% | 0.19 |
| 65-69 | 2016 | 2.61% | 0.29 |
| 65-69 | 2020 | 2.89% | 0.29 |
| 60-64 | 2016 | 3.39% | 0.40 |
| 60-64 | 2020 | 3.78% | 0.40 |
| 55-59 | 2016 | 4.35% | 0.37 |
| 55-59 | 2020 | 4.72% | 0.37 |
| 50-54 | 2016 | 5.27% | 0.28 |
| 50-54 | 2020 | 5.55% | 0.28 |
| 45-49 | 2016 | 6.14% | 0.15 |
| 45-49 | 2020 | 6.29% | 0.15 |
| 40-44 | 2016 | 6.79% | -0.08 |
| 40-44 | 2020 | 6.71% | -0.08 |
| 35-39 | 2016 | 7.15% | -0.12 |
| 35-39 | 2020 | 7.03% | -0.12 |
| 30-34 | 2016 | 7.47% | -0.15 |
| 30-34 | 2020 | 7.32% | -0.15 |
| 25-29 | 2016 | 7.76% | -0.15 |
| 25-29 | 2020 | 7.61% | -0.15 |
| 20-24 | 2016 | 8.12% | 0.01 |
| 20-24 | 2020 | 8.13% | 0.01 |
| 15-19 | 2016 | 8.67% | -0.23 |
| 15-19 | 2020 | 8.44% | -0.23 |
| 10-14 | 2016 | 8.92% | -0.42 |
| 10-14 | 2020 | 8.50% | -0.42 |
| 5-9 | 2016 | 9.01% | -0.38 |
| 5-9 | 2020 | 8.62% | -0.38 |
| 0-4 | 2016 | 9.18% | -0.54 |
| 0-4 | 2020 | 8.64% | -0.54 |
Percentage of Total Male & Female per age group

| Age Group | Male | Female | Total | % |
|---|---|---|---|---|
| Total | 2,144,802 | 2,133,698 | 4,278,500 | 100 |
| 85+ | 18,483 | 24,818 | 43,301 | 1.01 |
| 80-84 | 19,871 | 24,313 | 44,184 | 1.03 |
| 75-80 | 30,773 | 35,841 | 66,614 | 1.56 |
| 70-75 | 43,590 | 48,775 | 92,365 | 2.16 |
| 65-69 | 59,351 | 64,385 | 123,736 | 2.89 |
| 60-64 | 78,840 | 82,999 | 161,839 | 3.78 |
| 55-59 | 99,474 | 102,273 | 201,747 | 4.72 |
| 50-54 | 118,116 | 119,439 | 237,555 | 5.55 |
| 45-49 | 134,702 | 134,564 | 269,266 | 6.29 |
| 40-44 | 144,249 | 142,660 | 286,909 | 6.71 |
| 35-39 | 151,334 | 149,273 | 300,607 | 7.03 |
| 30-34 | 157,658 | 155,574 | 313,232 | 7.32 |
| 25-29 | 164,397 | 161,047 | 325,444 | 7.61 |
| 20-24 | 176,772 | 171,243 | 348,015 | 8.13 |
| 15-19 | 184,134 | 177,065 | 361,199 | 8.44 |
| 10-14 | 185,734 | 178,125 | 363,859 | 8.50 |
| 5-9 | 188,401 | 180,480 | 368,881 | 8.62 |
| 0-4 | 188,923 | 180,824 | 369,747 | 8.64 |

| Age Group | Male. in 1000s | Female in 1000s | % of total | % Males of total Males | % Females of total Females |
|---|---|---|---|---|---|
| Total | 2,144 / 4,278 (50%) | 2,133 / 4,278 (50%) | 4,278 / 4,278 (100%) | 2,144 / 2,144 (100%) | 2,133 / 2,133 (100%) |
| 85+ | 18 / 43 (42%) | 24 / 43 (56%) | 43 / 4,278 (1%) | 18 / 2,144 (0.8%) | 24 / 2,133 (1%) |
| 80-84 | 20 / 44 (45%) | 24 / 44 (55%) | 44 / 4,278 (1%) | 20 / 2,144 (0.9%) | 24 / 2,133 (1%) |
| 75-80 | 31 / 67 (46%) | 36 / 67 (54%) | 67 / 4,278 (2%) | 31 / 2,144 (1%) | 36 / 2,133 (2%) |
| 70-75 | 44 / 92 (48%) | 49 / 92 (53%) | 92 / 4,278 (2%) | 44 / 2,144 (2%) | 49 / 2,133 (2%) |
| 65-69 | 60 / 124 (48%) | 64 / 124 (52%) | 124 / 4,278 (3%) | 60 / 2,144 (3%) | 64 / 2,133 (3%) |
| 60-64 | 79 / 162 (49%) | 83 / 162 (51%) | 162 / 4,278 (4%) | 79 / 2,144 (4%) | 83 / 2,133 (4%) |
| 55-59 | 99 / 202 (49%) | 102 / 202 (50%) | 202 / 4,278 (5%) | 99 / 2,144 (5%) | 102 / 2,133 (5%) |
| 50-54 | 118 / 238 (50%) | 119 / 238 (50%) | 238 / 4,278 (6%) | 118 / 2,144 (6%) | 119 / 2,133 (6%) |
| 45-49 | 135 / 269 (50%) | 135 / 269 (50%) | 269 / 4,278 (6%) | 135 / 2,144 (6%) | 135 / 2,133 (6%) |
| 40-44 | 144 / 287 (50%) | 143 / 287 (50%) | 287 / 4,278 (7%) | 144 / 2,144 (7%) | 143 / 2,133 (7%) |
| 35-39 | 151 / 301 (50%) | 149 / 301 (50%) | 301 / 4,278 (7%) | 151 / 2,144 (7%) | 149 / 2,133 (7%) |
| 30-34 | 158 / 313 (50%) | 156 / 313 (50%) | 313 / 4,278 (7%) | 158 / 2,144 (7%) | 156 / 2,133 (7%) |
| 25-29 | 164 / 325 (50%) | 161 / 325 (50%) | 325 / 4,278 (8%) | 164 / 2,144 (8%) | 161 / 2,133 (8%) |
| 20-24 | 177 / 348 (51%) | 171 / 348 (49%) | 348 / 4,278 (8%) | 177 / 2,144 (8%) | 171 / 2,133 (8%) |
| 15-19 | 184 / 361 (51%) | 177 / 361 (49%) | 361 / 4,278 (8%) | 184 / 2,144 (9%) | 177 / 2,133 (8%) |
| 10-14 | 186 / 364 (51%) | 178 / 364 (49%) | 364 / 4,278 (9%) | 186 / 2,144 (9%) | 187 / 2,133 (9%) |
| 5-9 | 188 / 369 (51%) | 180 / 369 (49%) | 369 / 4,278 (9%) | 188 / 2,144 (9%) | 180 / 2,133 (8%) |
| 0-4 | 189 / 370 (51%) | 181 / 370 (49%) | 370 / 4,278 (9%) | 189 / 2,144 (9%) | 181 / 2,133 (8%) |

View source data.

(Note: This is an attempt to dynamically display a population pyramid for this data. The pyramid is canted to the left and the Male Data is made negative to create the image as close to what is desired as possible.)

View source data.

=== Population distribution ===
More than half the population lives in the Panama City-Colón metropolitan corridor.

| Province | Capital city | Population (census 2000) | Population (census 2010) | Population (census 2023) |
|---|---|---|---|---|
| Bocas del Toro | Bocas del Toro | 89,269 | 125,461 | 159,228 |
| Coclé | Penonomé | 202,461 | 233,788 | 268,264 |
| Colón | Colón | 204,208 | 241,928 | 281,956 |
| Chiriquí | David | 368,790 | 416,873 | 471,071 |
| Darién | La Palma | 40,264 | 48,378 | 54,235 |
| Herrera | Chitré | 102,465 | 109,955 | 122,071 |
| Los Santos | Las Tablas | 83,495 | 89,592 | 98,466 |
| Panamá | Ciudad de Panamá | 1,388,357 | 1,713,070 | 1,439,575 |
| Panamá Oeste Province | | | | 653,665 |
| Veraguas | Santiago | 209,076 | 226,991 | 259,791 |
| Comarca | Capital city | Population | | |
| Emberá-Wounaan | Unión Choco | 8,246 | 10,001 | 12,358 |
| Kuna de Madugandí | N/D | N/D | N/D | |
| Kuna Yala | El Porvenir | 32,446 | 33,109 | 32,016 |
| Kuna de Wargandí | N/D | N/D | N/D | |
| Ngäbe-Buglé | Buabidi | 110,080 | 156,747 | 212,084 |

== Vital statistics ==
View source data.

=== UN estimates ===
Registration of vital events (especially deaths) was in Panama not complete until the end of the 20th century. The Population Departement of the United Nations prepared the following estimates.

| Period | Live births per year | Deaths per year | Natural change per year | CBR* | CDR* | NC* | TFR* | IMR* | Life expectancy total | Life expectancy males | Life expectancy females |
|---|---|---|---|---|---|---|---|---|---|---|---|
| 1950-1955 | 38 000 | 11 000 | 27 000 | 41.4 | 12.0 | 29.5 | 5.76 | 92 | 56.8 | 55.9 | 57.8 |
| 1955-1960 | 44 000 | 11 000 | 33 000 | 41.7 | 10.6 | 31.1 | 5.87 | 80 | 59.5 | 58.6 | 60.5 |
| 1960-1965 | 50 000 | 11 000 | 39 000 | 40.9 | 9.2 | 31.6 | 5.79 | 68 | 62.1 | 61.1 | 63.3 |
| 1965-1970 | 55 000 | 12 000 | 44 000 | 38.8 | 8.1 | 30.7 | 5.41 | 58 | 64.3 | 63.2 | 65.6 |
| 1970-1975 | 59 000 | 11 000 | 48 000 | 36.1 | 7.0 | 29.2 | 4.88 | 48 | 66.7 | 65.1 | 68.5 |
| 1975-1980 | 61 000 | 11 000 | 50 000 | 32.5 | 5.9 | 26.6 | 4.19 | 39 | 69.2 | 67.2 | 71.5 |
| 1980-1985 | 62 000 | 11 000 | 51 000 | 29.5 | 5.4 | 24.1 | 3.63 | 34 | 71.0 | 68.6 | 73.7 |
| 1985-1990 | 64 000 | 12 000 | 53 000 | 27.3 | 5.1 | 22.3 | 3.24 | 29 | 72.4 | 69.6 | 75.4 |
| 1990-1995 | 67 000 | 13 000 | 54 000 | 25.5 | 4.9 | 20.6 | 2.96 | 26 | 73.6 | 70.8 | 76.5 |
| 1995-2000 | 71 000 | 14 000 | 57 000 | 24.6 | 4.8 | 19.8 | 2.87 | 24 | 74.6 | 72.2 | 77.2 |
* CBR = crude birth rate (per 1000); CDR = crude death rate (per 1000); NC = natural change (per 1000); IMR = infant mortality rate per 1000 births; TFR = total fertility rate (number of children per woman)

=== Registered births and deaths ===
| Year | Population | Live births | Deaths | Natural increase | Crude birth rate | Crude death rate | Rate of natural increase | Crude migration rate | TFR |
|---|---|---|---|---|---|---|---|---|---|
| 1952 | 901,302 | 29,013 | 6,791 | 22,222 | 36.0 | 8.4 | 27.6 | | |
| 1953 | 924,969 | 31,428 | 7,638 | 23,790 | 37.9 | 9.2 | 28.7 | -2.5 | |
| 1954 | 949,975 | 33,521 | 7,511 | 26,010 | 39.3 | 8.8 | 30.5 | -3.8 | |
| 1955 | 976,284 | 34,592 | 8,059 | 26,533 | 39.4 | 9.2 | 30.2 | -3 | |
| 1956 | 1,003,903 | 35,582 | 8,352 | 27,230 | 39.3 | 9.2 | 30.1 | -2.4 | |
| 1957 | 1,032,904 | 37,743 | 8,656 | 29,087 | 40.5 | 9.3 | 31.2 | -3 | |
| 1958 | 1,063,318 | 37,733 | 8,364 | 29,369 | 39.3 | 8.7 | 30.6 | -1.9 | |
| 1959 | 1,095,201 | 40,296 | 8,959 | 31,337 | 40.8 | 9.1 | 31.7 | -2.5 | |
| 1960 | 1,128,327 | 42,359 | 8,827 | 33,532 | 39.9 | 8.3 | 31.6 | -1.9 | 5.25 |
| 1961 | 1,162,672 | 44,207 | 8,851 | 35,356 | 40.4 | 8.1 | 32.3 | -2.5 | |
| 1962 | 1,198,369 | 46,274 | 8,239 | 38,035 | 41.1 | 7.3 | 33.8 | -3.9 | |
| 1963 | 1,235,291 | 46,656 | 9,239 | 37,417 | 40.2 | 8.0 | 32.2 | -2.9 | |
| 1964 | 1,273,250 | 47,419 | 8,743 | 38,676 | 39.6 | 7.3 | 32.3 | -3.2 | |
| 1965 | 1,312,121 | 48,377 | 9,035 | 39,342 | 39.2 | 7.3 | 31.9 | -2.9 | 5.19 |
| 1966 | 1,351,853 | 49,394 | 9,184 | 40,210 | 38.9 | 7.2 | 31.7 | -2.8 | |
| 1967 | 1,392,459 | 50,795 | 8,938 | 41,857 | 38.8 | 6.8 | 32.0 | -3.3 | |
| 1968 | 1,434,024 | 52,489 | 9,568 | 42,921 | 38.9 | 7.1 | 31.8 | -3.3 | |
| 1969 | 1,476,580 | 52,799 | 9,791 | 43,008 | 38.0 | 7.0 | 31.0 | -2.6 | |
| 1970 | 1,519,923 | 53,287 | 10,225 | 43,062 | 37.1 | 7.1 | 30.0 | -1.5 | 5.04 |
| 1971 | 1,563,870 | 54,948 | 9,857 | 45,091 | 37.2 | 6.7 | 30.5 | -2.3 | |
| 1972 | 1,608,308 | 54,910 | 9,076 | 45,834 | 36.0 | 6.0 | 30.0 | -2.2 | |
| 1973 | 1,653,083 | 52,091 | 9,161 | 42,930 | 33.2 | 5.8 | 27.4 | -0.1 | |
| 1974 | 1,698,053 | 52,772 | 9,001 | 43,771 | 32. 6 | 5.6 | 27.0 | -0.2 | |
| 1975 | 1,743,069 | 53,790 | 8,683 | 45,107 | 32.3 | 5.2 | 27.1 | -0.8 | 4.25 |
| 1976 | 1,788,186 | 53,002 | 8,564 | 44,438 | 30.8 | 5.0 | 25.8 | -0.1 | |
| 1977 | 1,833,581 | 52,722 | 8,036 | 44,686 | 29.8 | 4.5 | 25.3 | -0.2 | |
| 1978 | 1,879,377 | 53,040 | 7,555 | 45,485 | 29.1 | 4.1 | 25.0 | -0.5 | |
| 1979 | 1,925,621 | 52,919 | 8,192 | 44,727 | 28.2 | 4.4 | 23.8 | 0.1 | |
| 1980 | 1,972,462 | 52,626 | 7,959 | 44,667 | 26.9 | 4.1 | 22.8 | 0.5 | 3.44 |
| 1981 | 2,019,865 | 53,873 | 7,976 | 45,897 | 26.9 | 4.0 | 22.9 | 0.9 | |
| 1982 | 2,067,647 | 54,491 | 8,142 | 46,349 | 26.7 | 4.0 | 22.7 | 0.7 | |
| 1983 | 2,115,781 | 55,222 | 8,499 | 46,723 | 26.4 | 4.1 | 22.3 | 0.6 | |
| 1984 | 2,164,281 | 56,659 | 8,250 | 48,409 | 26.5 | 3.9 | 22.6 | -0.1 | |
| 1985 | 2,213,209 | 58,038 | 8,991 | 49,047 | 26.6 | 4.1 | 22.5 | -0.4 | 3.20 |
| 1986 | 2,262,571 | 57,655 | 8,942 | 48,713 | 25.9 | 4.0 | 21.9 | -0.2 | |
| 1987 | 2,312,359 | 57,647 | 9,105 | 48,542 | 25.3 | 4.0 | 21.3 | 0 | |
| 1988 | 2,362,523 | 58,459 | 9,382 | 49,077 | 25.2 | 4.0 | 21.2 | -0.2 | |
| 1989 | 2,413,043 | 59,069 | 9,557 | 49,512 | 25.1 | 4.1 | 21.0 | -0.3 | |
| 1990 | 2,463,727 | 59,904 | 9,799 | 50,105 | 25.0 | 4.1 | 20.9 | -0.6 | 2.88 |
| 1991 | 2,514,940 | 60,080 | 9,683 | 50,397 | 24.6 | 4.0 | 20.6 | 0.5 | |
| 1992 | 2,567,277 | 59,905 | 10,143 | 49,762 | 24.1 | 4.1 | 20.0 | 1 | |
| 1993 | 2,620,647 | 59,191 | 10,669 | 48,522 | 23.3 | 4.2 | 19.1 | 1.6 | |
| 1994 | 2,675,038 | 59,947 | 10,983 | 48,964 | 23.2 | 4.3 | 18.9 | 1.6 | |
| 1995 | 2,730,591 | 61,939 | 11,032 | 50,907 | 23.5 | 4.2 | 19.3 | 1 | 2.72 |
| 1996 | 2,787,492 | 63,401 | 11,161 | 52,240 | 23.7 | 4.2 | 19.5 | 0.8 | |
| 1997 | 2,846,042 | 68,009 | 12,179 | 55,830 | 25.0 | 4.5 | 20.5 | -0.3 | |
| 1998 | 2,905,965 | 62,351 | 11,824 | 50,527 | 22.6 | 4.3 | 18.3 | 1.9 | |
| 1999 | 2,966,362 | 64,248 | 11,938 | 52,310 | 22.9 | 4.2 | 18.7 | 1.3 | |
| 2000 | 3,026,993 | 64,839 | 11,841 | 52,998 | 22.7 | 4.1 | 18.6 | 1.3 | 2.67 |
| 2001 | 3,086,251 | 63,900 | 12,442 | 51,458 | 21.3 | 4.1 | 17.2 | 2.6 | 2.51 |
| 2002 | 3,144,898 | 61,671 | 12,428 | 49,243 | 20.2 | 4.1 | 16.1 | 3.5 | 2.39 |
| 2003 | 3,203,629 | 61,753 | 13,248 | 48,505 | 19.8 | 4.3 | 15.5 | 3.8 | 2.37 |
| 2004 | 3,262,502 | 62,743 | 13,475 | 49,268 | 19.8 | 4.2 | 15.6 | 3.3 | 2.38 |
| 2005 | 3,321,578 | 63,645 | 14,180 | 49,465 | 19.7 | 4.4 | 15.3 | 3.3 | 2.39 |
| 2006 | 3,380,985 | 65,764 | 14,358 | 51,406 | 20.0 | 4.4 | 15.6 | 2.7 | 2.44 |
| 2007 | 3,440,991 | 67,364 | 14,775 | 52,589 | 19.4 | 4.3 | 15.1 | 2.8 | 2.48 |
| 2008 | 3,501,700 | 68,759 | 15,115 | 53,644 | 19.4 | 4.3 | 15.1 | 2.5 | 2.51 |
| 2009 | 3,563,355 | 68,364 | 15,498 | 52,866 | 19.0 | 4.3 | 14.7 | 2.5 | 2.47 |
| 2010 | 3,626,670 | 67,955 | 16,542 | 51,413 | 18.6 | 4.5 | 14.1 | 2.8 | 2.43 |
| 2011 | 3,692,023 | 73,292 | 16,367 | 56,925 | 19.7 | 4.4 | 15.3 | 1.3 | 2.47 |
| 2012 | 3,759,498 | 75,486 | 17,350 | 58,136 | 19.9 | 4.6 | 15.3 | 1.5 | 2.51 |
| 2013 | 3,829,455 | 73,804 | 17,767 | 56,037 | 19.2 | 4.6 | 14.6 | 1.8 | 2.43 |
| 2014 | 3,901,544 | 75,183 | 18,171 | 57,012 | 19.2 | 4.6 | 14.6 | 1.4 | 2.45 |
| 2015 | 3,975,949 | 75,901 | 18,182 | 57,719 | 19.1 | 4.6 | 14.5 | 1.1 | 2.45 |
| 2016 | 4,052,058 | 75,184 | 18,882 | 56,302 | 18.6 | 4.7 | 13.9 | 1.4 | 2.42 |
| 2017 | 4,128,000 | 76,166 | 19,482 | 56,684 | 18.6 | 4.8 | 13.8 | 1.1 | 2.40 |
| 2018 | 4,201,112 | 76,863 | 19,720 | 57,143 | 18.5 | 4.7 | 13.7 | 0.8 | 2.40 |
| 2019 | 4,269,777 | 72,456 | 20,049 | 52,407 | 17.2 | 4.8 | 12.4 | 1.8 | 2.24 |
| 2020 | 4,331,049 | 69,945 | 25,151 | 44,794 | 16.1 | 5.8 | 10.3 | 3.6 | 2.14 |
| 2021 | 4,385,682 | 66,498 | 24,663 | 41,835 | 15.2 | 5.6 | 9.5 | 4 | 2.02 |
| 2022 | 4,440,735 | 63,920 | 22,860 | 41,060 | 14.4 | 5.1 | 9.2 | 3.9 | 1.92 |
| 2023 | 4,496,166 | 59,907 | 21,735 | 38,172 | 13.3 | 4.8 | 8.5 | 4.3 | 1.85 |
| 2024 | 4,548,681 | 59,729 | 23,206 | 36,523 | 13.1 | 5.1 | 8.0 | 4.5 | 1.72 |
| 2025 | 4,598,365 | 55,340 | 19,719 | 35,621 | 12.0 | 4.3 | 7.8 | | 1.6 |

(p)=preliminary data

== Ethnic groups ==
Ethnic groups in Panama (2023 census.)
1. Non indigenous, Non afrodescendants (51.2%)
2. Native Panamanians (Ngäbe 10.95%, Kuna 2.76%, Emberá 1.27%, Buglé 0.59%, other 1.58%, unspecified 0.02%) (17.2%)
3. Black or African descent (31.7%)

The culture, customs, and language of Panama are predominantly Caribbean Spanish. In 2010 the population was 65% Mestizo (mixed European and Amerindian), 12.3% Native Panamanians, 9.2% black, 6.8% mulattoes, and 6.7% white. According to the 2023 census 17.2% of the population were native Panamanians, 31.7% was of (part) African descent, while the remainder (51%) were mestizo (mixed European and Amerindian) and whites.

=== Indigenous Panamanians ===
Population of Panama according to ethnic group
| Ethnic group | Census 1990 | | Census 2000 | | Census 2010 | | Census 2023 | |
| Ethnic group | Number | % | Number | % | Number | % | Number | % |
|---|---|---|---|---|---|---|---|---|
| Amerindian | 194,269 | 8.3 | 285,231 | 10.0 | 417,559 | 12.3 | 698,114 | 17.2 |
| Non-indigenous | 2,135,060 | 91.7 | 2,553,946 | 90.0 | 2,988,254 | 87.7 | 3,366,666 | 82.8 |
| Total | 2,329,329 | | 2,839,177 | | 3,405,813 | | 4,064,780 | |

Indigenous population of Panama according to ethnic group
| Ethnic group | Census 1990 | | Census 2000 | | Census 2010 | | Census 2023 | |
| Ethnic group | Number | % | Number | % | Number | % | Number | % |
|---|---|---|---|---|---|---|---|---|
| Ngäbe (Guaymi) | 123,626 | 63.6 | 169,130 | 59.3 | 260,058 | 62.3 | 444,878 | 63.7 |
| Buglé (Bokota) | 3,784 | 1.9 | 18,724 | 6.6 | 26,871 | 6.4 | 24,488 | 3.5 |
| Guna | 47,298 | 24.3 | 61,707 | 21.6 | 80,526 | 19.3 | 112,319 | 16.1 |
| Emberá | 14,659 | 7.5 | 22,485 | 7.9 | 31,284 | 7.5 | 51,657 | 7.4 |
| Wounaan | 2,605 | 1.3 | 6,882 | 2.4 | 7,279 | 1.7 | 10,634 | 1.5 |
| Teribe/Naso | 2,194 | 1.1 | 3,305 | 1.2 | 4,046 | 1.0 | 6,899 | 1.0 |
| Bribri | | | 2,521 | 0.9 | 1,068 | 0.3 | 799 | 0.1 |
| Other | 103 | 0.1 | | | 460 | 0.1 | 45,498 | 6.5 |
| Not declared | | | 477 | 0.2 | 5,967 | 1.4 | 975 | 0.1 |

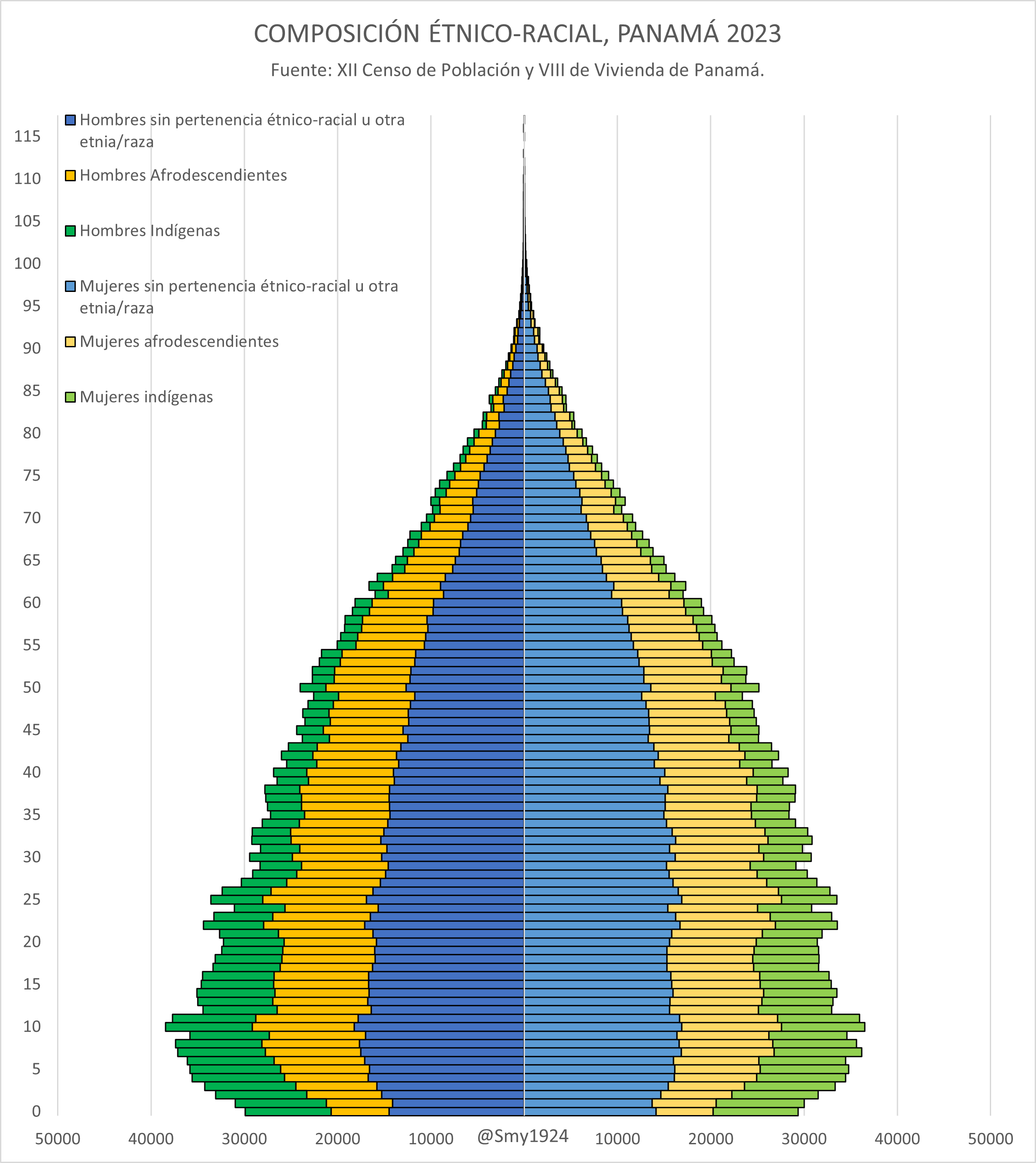
No or another ethnic-racial group
Afrodescendants
Indigenous
Race and Ethnicity

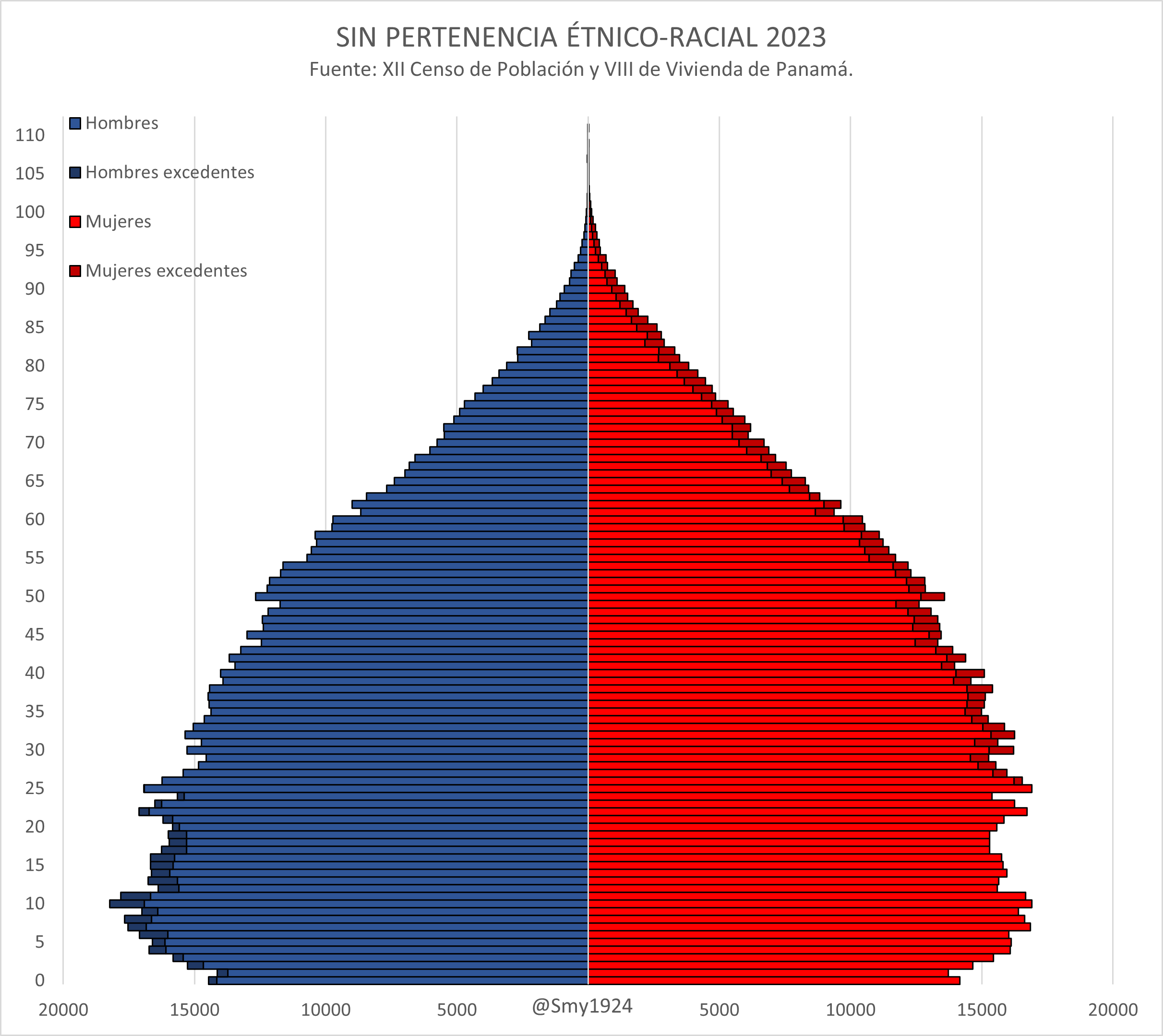
No ethnic-racial group or another ethnic-racial group

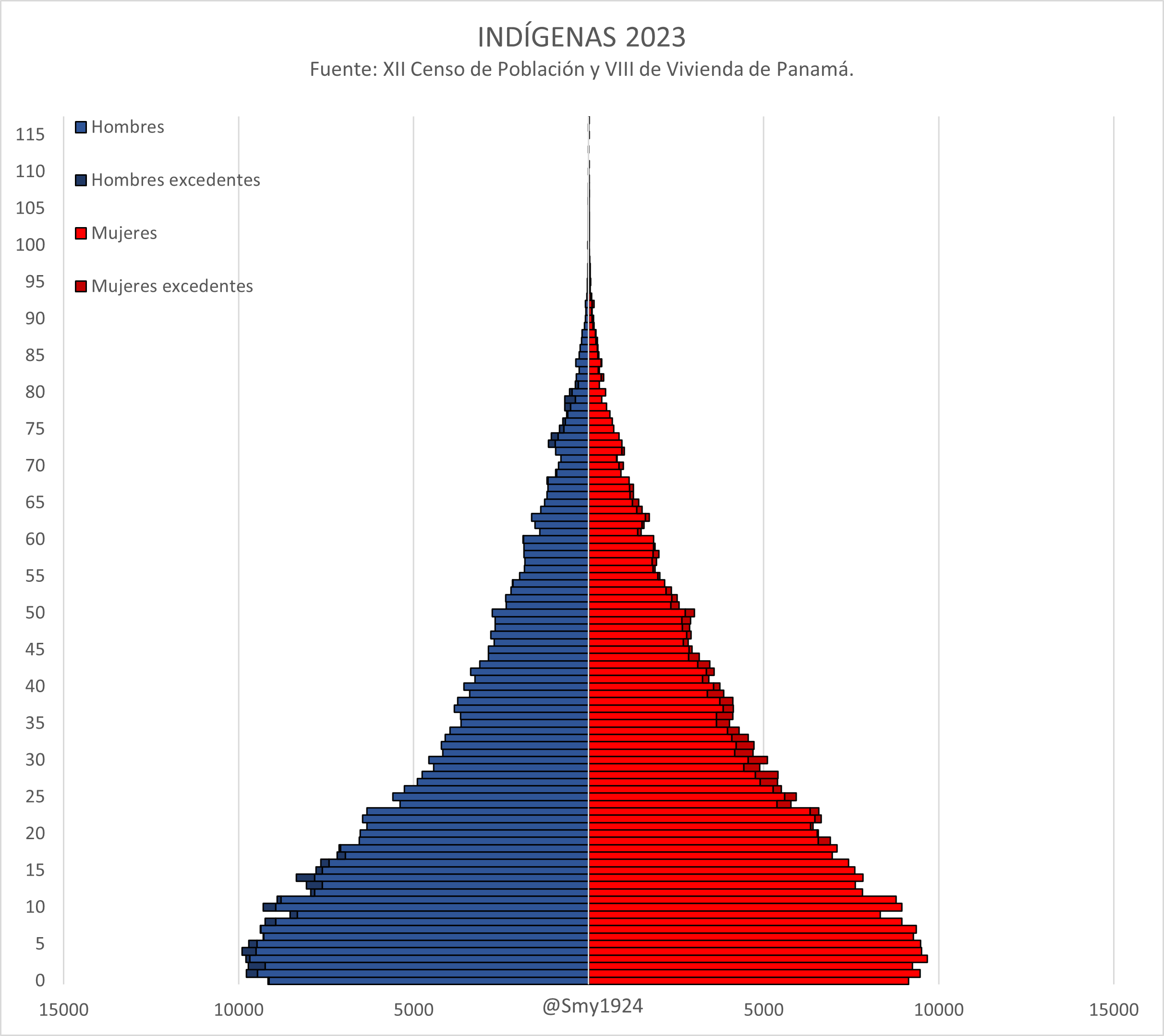
Indigenous

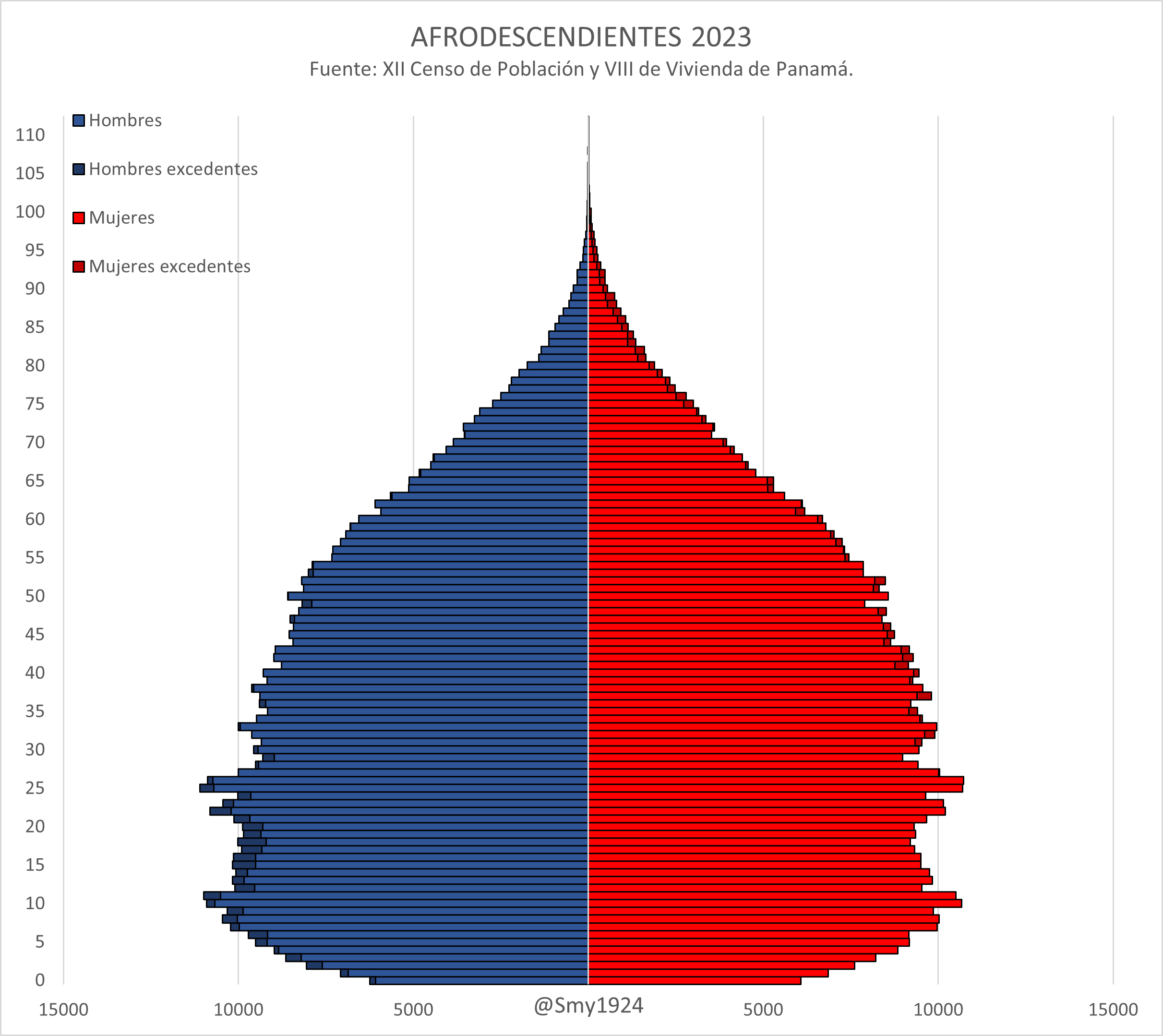
Afrodescendants
Ethnic-racial composition by age and sex, 2023

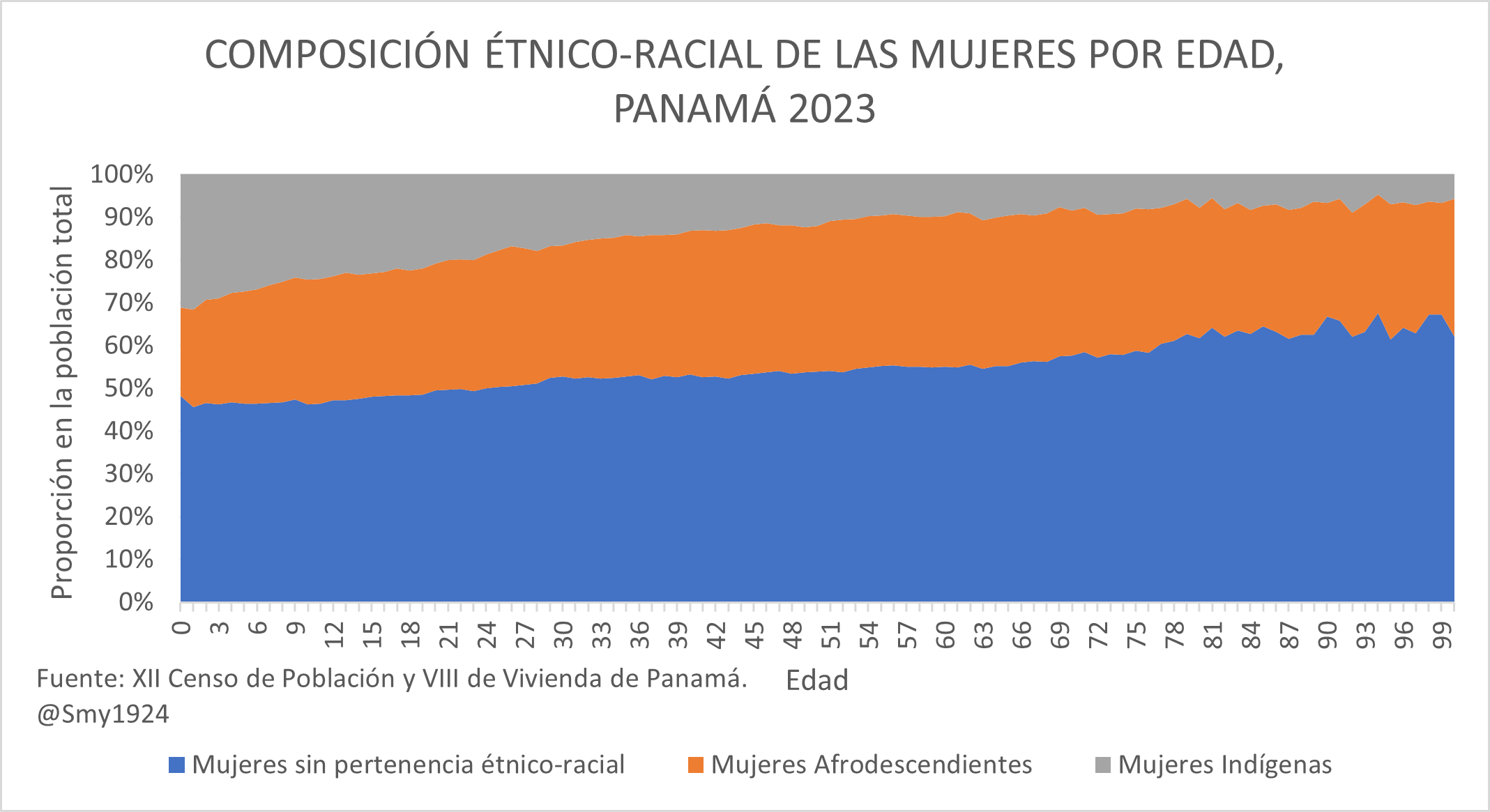
Female

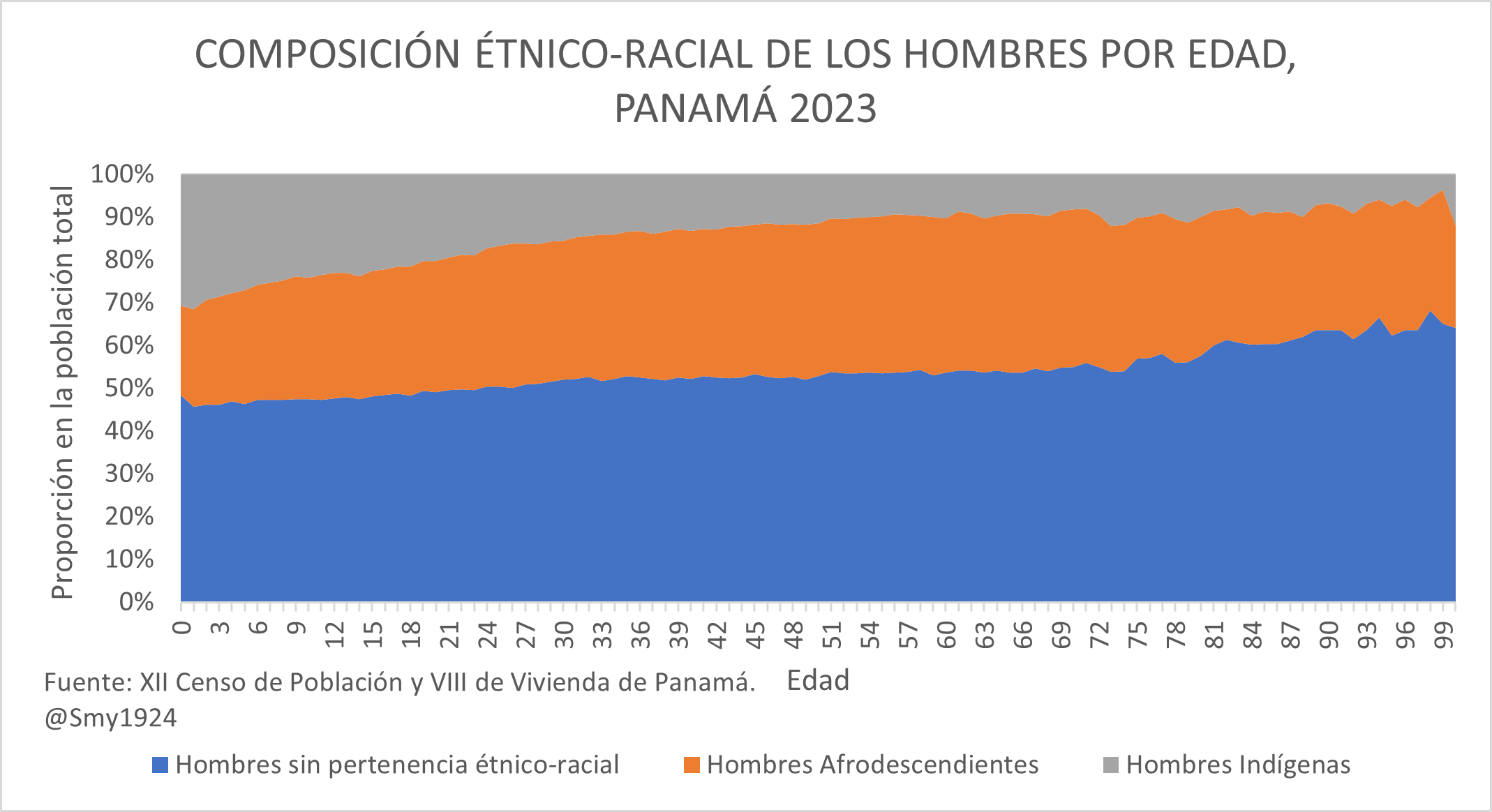
Male

=== European Panamanians ===
The European population residing in Panama consists predominantly of individuals with Spanish heritage, a demographic consequence of the historical Spanish colonial period.

=== Asian Panamanians ===
Panama has a considerable population of Asian origin; in particular those of Chinese and West Asian (Lebanese, Palestinian, and Syrian) origin. The first Chinese immigrated to Panama from southern China in the 19th century to help build the Panama Railroad. There followed several waves of immigrants, especially after the 1970s, when the ensuing decades saw up to 80,000 immigrants from all over China. At least 50,000 Panamanians are ethnically Chinese, though some estimates count as many as 135,000. Most of the Chinese population reside in the province of Chiriquí. Some studies suggest that almost 1 million Panamanians have at least one Chinese ancestor.

=== African Panamanians ===
Afro-Panamanians first arrived during the colonial era. They are intermixed in the general population or live in small Afro-Panamanian communities along the Atlantic Coast and in villages within the Darién jungle. Most of the people in Darien are fishermen or small-scale farmers growing crops such as bananas, rice and coffee as well as raising livestock. Other Afro-Panamanians descend from later migrants from the Caribbean who came to work on railroad-construction projects, commercial agricultural enterprises, and (especially) the canal. Important Afro-Caribbean community areas include towns and cities such as Colón, Cristobal and Balboa, in the former Canal Zone, as well as the Río Abajo area of Panama City. Another region with a large Afro-Caribbean population is the province of Bocas del Toro on the Caribbean coast just south of Costa Rica.

Most of the Panamanian population of West Indian descent owe their presence in the country to the monumental efforts to build the Panama Canal in the late 19th and early 20th centuries. Three-quarters of the 50,000 workers who built the canal were Afro-Caribbean migrants from the British West Indies. Thousands of Afro-Caribbean workers were recruited from Jamaica, Barbados and Trinidad.

== Languages ==
Spanish is the official and dominant language spoken in Panama; the local variant is Panamanian Spanish. Many other languages are also spoken, including seven indigenous languages- Buglere, Guaymí, Guna, Northern Embera, Teribe and Bocas del Toro Creole. English can be heard in many business or government settings, too.

== Religion ==
Religion in Panama (2013)
1. Roman Catholic (85.0%)
2. Protestants (15.0%)

The majority of Panamanians are Christian; most are Roman Catholics as a result centuries of Spanish colonial influence. Other faiths exist in Panama by the country's tolerance and freedom of religion, there are large Protestant, Jewish, Bahá'í, Muslim and Hindu religious groups in Panama.

== See also ==
- Panama
- Ethnic groups in Central America
