= Ngöbe Buglé (disambiguation) =

Ngöbe Buglé may refer to:

- Ngöbe-Buglé Comarca, an indigenous landbase in Panama
- Ngäbe and Bugle, two Indigenous peoples of Panama
- Buglere language, also called the Buglé language
- Ngöbe language, also called the Ngabere language
- Chichica, Ngöbe-Buglé, capital of the Ngöbe-Buglé Comarca
