= Panamanians =

People of Panama

Panamanians Panameños
- Flag of Panama

Total population
- Panama 4.279 million

Regions with significant populations
- United States: 99,764 – 260,645
- Costa Rica: 13,711
- Spain: 5,730
- Colombia: 3,123
- Canada: 2,814
- Mexico: 1,767
- Italy: 1,102
- Ecuador: 1,008
- Venezuela: 828
- Germany: 811
- United Kingdom: 789
- Dominican Republic: 789
- Brazil: 660
- Peru: 644
- Switzerland: 588
- France: 582
- El Salvador: 458
- Nicaragua: 423
- Honduras: 406
- Netherlands: 390
- Guatemala: 321
- Sweden: 319
- Australia: 289
- Belgium: 211
- Argentina: 161
- Greece: 158
- Bolivia: 121
- Denmark: 101
- Japan: 98
- Norway: 85
- Jamaica: 74
- Taiwan: 40

Languages
- Panamanian Spanish (predominantly) Bocas del Toro Creole, Guaymí and other Amerindian languages

Religion
- Predominantly Roman Catholicism; Judaism, Protestantism, Santería, Baháʼí and Indigenous Amerindian religion

Related ethnic groups
- Afro-Panamanians, Nicaraguans, Costa Ricans, Colombians, and other Latin Americans

Panamanians (Spanish: panameños; feminine panameñas) are people identified with Panama, a country in Central America (the central part of the American continent), and with residential, legal, historical, or cultural connections with North America. For most Panamanians, several or all of these connections exist and are collectively the source of their Panamanian identity. Panama is a multilingual and multicultural society, home to people of many different ethnicities and religions. Therefore, many Panamanians do not equate their nationality with ethnicity, but with citizenship and allegiance to Panama. The overwhelming majority of Panamanians are the product of varying degrees of admixture between European ethnic groups (predominantly Spaniards) with native Amerindians (who are indigenous to Panama's modern territory) and Black Africans.

The culture held in common by most Panamanians is referred to as mainstream Panamanian culture, a culture largely derived from the traditions of the Indigenous people and the early Spanish settlers, along with other Europeans arriving later such as Italians, with west African culture as another important component.

== Culture ==
The culture of Panama derived from the cultures of Indigenous peoples of Panama, European art and traditions, as well as African Culture that were brought over by the Spanish to Panama. Hegemonic forces have created hybrid forms of this by blending African and Native American culture with European culture. For example, the tamborito is a Spanish dance with that was blended with Native American rhythms and dance moves. Dance is a symbol of the diverse cultures that have coupled in Panama. The culture, customs, and language of the Panamanians are predominantly Caribbean and Spanish.

== Ethnic groups ==
Ethnic Groups
1. Mestizos (mixed Amerindian and White) (65.0%)
2. Native Americans (12.3%)
3. Black or African descent (9.20%)
4. Mulattos (mixed Black African and White) (6.80%)
5. White (6.70%)

=== Mestizo ===
Mestizos are people who are of mixed European and Indigenous ancestry. Mestizos are the majority in Panama, accounting for 65% of the country's population.

=== Indigenous or Amerindian ===
Indigenous or Native Panamanians, are the native peoples of Panama. According to the 2010 census, they make up 12.3% of the overall population of 3.4 million, or just over 418,000 people. The Ngäbe and Guna people comprise the majority of the Indigenous population.

=== Black ===
Afro-Panamanians played a significant role in the creation of the republic. The descendants of the Africans who arrived during the colonial era are intermixed in the general population, or live in small Afro-Panamanian communities along the Atlantic Coast and in villages within the Darién Gap. Most of the people in Darién are fishermen or small-scale farmers growing crops such as bananas, rice, and coffee, as well as raising livestock. Other Afro-Panamanians descend from later migrants from the Caribbean who came to work on railroad construction projects, commercial agricultural enterprises, and (especially) the Panama canal. Important Afro-Caribbean community areas include towns and cities such as Colón, Cristobal, and Balboa in the former Canal Zone, as well as the Río Abajo area of Panama City. Another region with a large Afro-Caribbean population is the province of Bocas del Toro on the Caribbean coast just south of Costa Rica.

Most of the Panamanian population of West Indian descent can trace their presence in the country to the large-scale efforts to build the Panama Canal in the late 19th and early 20th centuries. Three-quarters of the 50,000 workers who built the canal were Afro-Caribbean migrants from the British West Indies. Thousands of Afro-Caribbean workers were recruited from Jamaica, Barbados and Trinidad.

=== White or Europeans ===
White Panamanians make up 6.7% of the population, with the majority being of Spanish descent. Other reported ancestries include Dutch, English, French, German, Swiss, Danish, Irish, Greek, Italian, Lebanese, Portuguese, Turkish, Polish, Russian, and Ukrainian. There is also a sizable Jewish community.

=== Asian ===
Panama, partly owing to its historical reliance on commerce, is an ethnically diverse society. It has considerable populations of Afro-Antillean and Chinese origin. The first Chinese immigrated to Panama from southern China to help build the Panama Railroad in the 19th century. There followed several waves of immigrants whose descendants number around 50,000. Starting in the 1970s, a further 80,000 have immigrated from other parts of China as well.

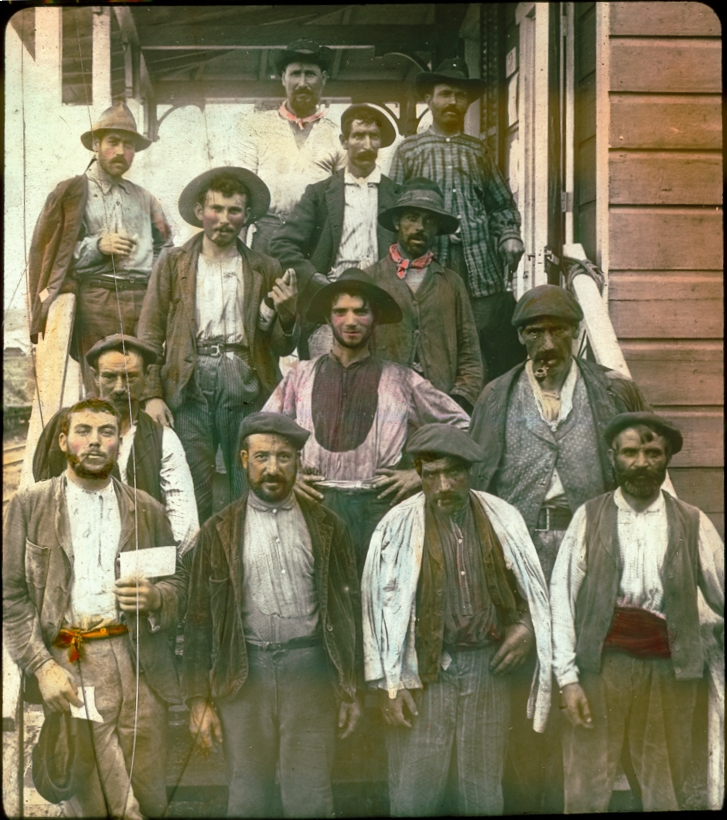
Spanish laborers during construction of the Panama Canal, early 1900s.

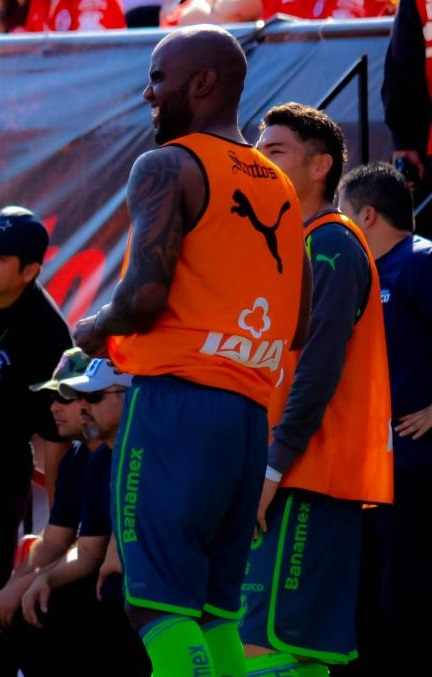
Panamanian footballer Felipe Baloy

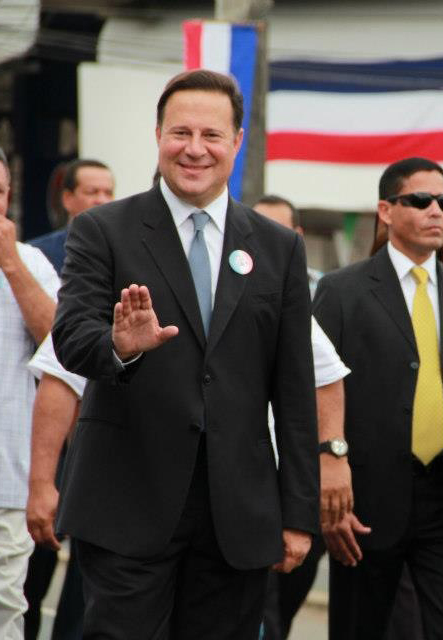
Juan Carlos Varela, 37th President of Panama

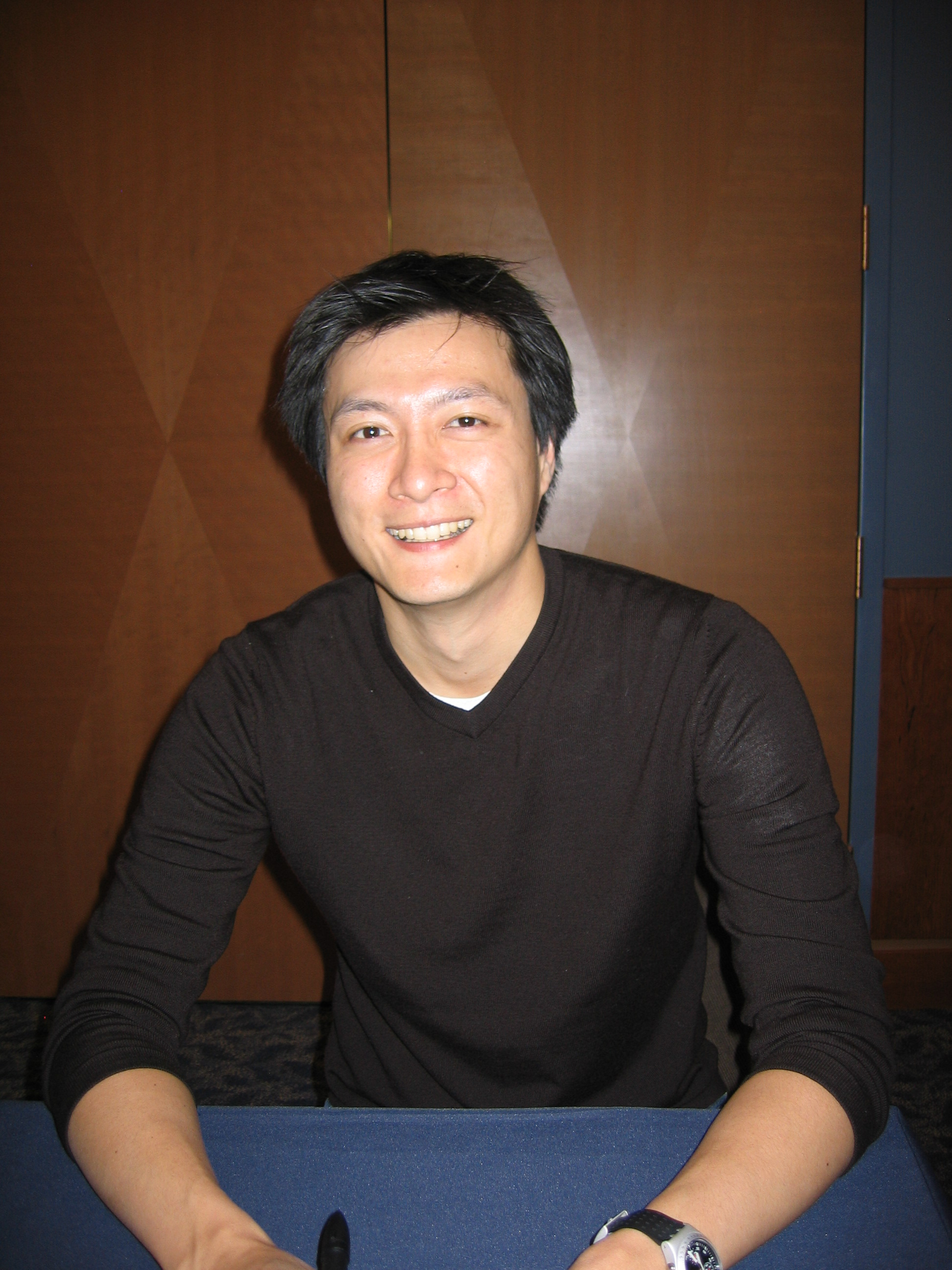
Jorge Cham, creator of PhDComics

Indigenous population of Panama according to ethnic group
Ethnic group	Census 1990		Census 2000		Census 2010		Census 2023	
Ethnic group	Number	%	Number	%	Number	%	Number	%
Ngäbe (Guaymi)	123,626	63.6	169,130	59.3	260,058	62.3	444,878	63.7
Buglé (Bokota)	3,784	1.9	18,724	6.6	26,871	6.4	24,488	3.5
Guna	47,298	24.3	61,707	21.6	80,526	19.3	112,319	16.1
Emberá	14,659	7.5	22,485	7.9	31,284	7.5	51,657	7.4
Wounaan	2,605	1.3	6,882	2.4	7,279	1.7	10,634	1.5
Teribe/Naso	2,194	1.1	3,305	1.2	4,046	1.0	6,899	1.0
Bribri			2,521	0.9	1,068	0.3	799	0.1
Other	103	0.1			460	0.1	45,498	6.5
Not declared			477	0.2	5,967	1.4	975	0.1

Population of Panama Overall
Ethnic group	Census 1990		Census 2000		Census 2010	
Ethnic group	Number	%	Number	%	Number	%
Non-Indigenous	2,135,060	91.7	2,553,946	90.0	2,988,254	87.7
Amerindian	194,269	8.3	285,231	10.0	417,559	12.3
Total	2,329,329		2,839,177		3,405,813	

== Languages ==
Spanish is the official and dominant language. About 93% of the population speak Spanish as their first language, though many citizens speak both English and Spanish or native languages, such as Ngäbere. Many languages, including seven indigenous languages, are also spoken in Panama. English is sometimes spoken by many professionals and those working in the business or governmental sectors of society.

== Religion ==
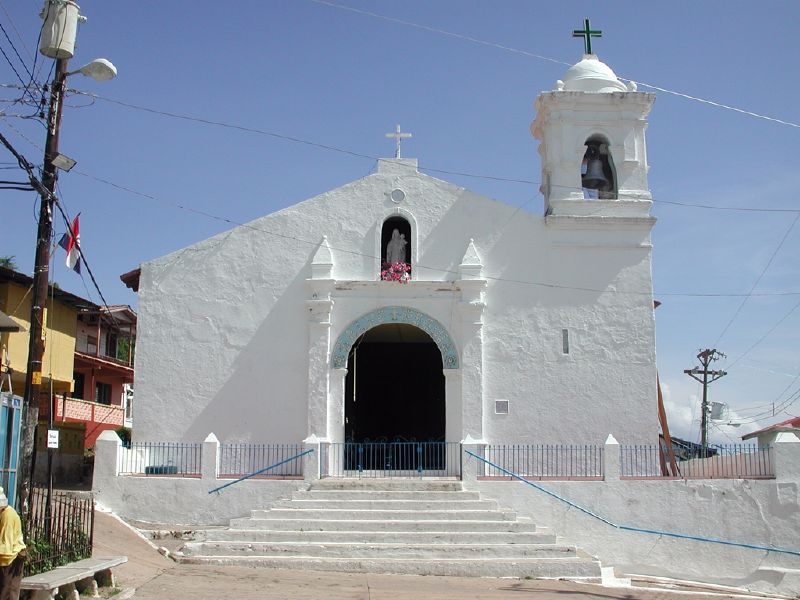
Iglesia San Pedro, Taboga Island, Panama. The Iglesia San Pedro is the second-oldest colonial church in the Western Hemisphere.

The government of Panama does not collect statistics on the religious affiliation of citizens, but various sources estimate that 75 to 85 percent of the population identifies itself as Roman Catholic and 15 to 25 percent as evangelical Christian. The Baháʼí Faith community of Panama is estimated at 2.00% of the national population, or about 60,000, including about 10% of the Guaymí population; the Baháʼís maintain one of the world's eight Baháʼí Houses of Worship in Panama.

== See also ==
- List of Panamanians
- Panama
- Ethnic groups in Central America
- Criollo people
- Panamanian Americans
- Hispanics
