= Bokota =

Bokota may refer to:

- Bokota people, an ethnic group of Panama
- Bokota language, a language of Panama
- Dafni Bokota, Greek singer and presenter
- Labama Bokota, Rwandan footballer
