= Indigenous peoples and the UN-REDD Program in Panama =

Me Agency

Following a series of disputes regarding the participation of indigenous peoples in the Panama UN-REDD National Programme, the National Coordinating Body of the Indigenous Peoples of Panama (COONAPIP) announced their withdrawal from the climate change mitigation program on February 25, 2013. COONAPIP, which brings together the country's seven indigenous peoples and their 12 traditional indigenous representative structures, cited a failure to ensure guarantees of respect for indigenous rights and the full and effective participation of indigenous peoples, and a breach of agreements made during the process of the program's approval. In March 2013, the Panama UN-REDD National Programme was suspended pending the results of an independent investigation and evaluation. The dispute was highlighted as an important development in the broader context of global policy efforts to implement initiatives to Reduce Emissions from Deforestation and Degradation (REDD+), which were at the time grappling with issues around the participation of indigenous peoples and forest communities in related initiatives, including the implementation of Free, Prior and Informed Consent. Preliminary results of an independent investigation and evaluation commissioned by the UN-REDD Programme were published, as well as a study of the conflict by a Central American non-governmental research center.

In December 2013, the Panama UN-REDD National Programme was reopened following an agreement between the Panama Government, through its National Environmental Authority (ANAM), and indigenous peoples, through the National Coordinating Entity of Indigenous Peoples in Panama (COONAPIP). This was realized through extensive consultations between ANAM and COONAPIP to resolve issues and develop an Environmental Agenda between indigenous peoples and the ANAM, which includes a revised result framework of the UN-REDD National Joint Programme of Panama. The General Assembly of COONAPIP, which took place on 29 November 2013 in Playa Muerto, in the Darien province of Panama, approved the Environmental Agenda jointly developed between ANAM and COONAPIP.

On the reopening of the National Programme in Panama, Candido Mezua, President of COONAPIP said, "We feel satisfied that the process followed with ANAM will help us to correct issues, and COONAPIP is going to engage again in the Programme." He added, "It is time to trust again".

Mezua emphasized that REDD+ had to be conducted with full respect for the rights of indigenous peoples, asking for the support of UN agencies to ensure that rights such as free, prior and informed consent (FPIC) are respected and appropriate grievance mechanisms are made available for indigenous peoples. He further underscored the complexities and nuances of REDD+ and offered COONAPIP's contribution to national REDD+ efforts.

In December 2013, the UN-REDD Programme Policy Board congratulated Panama on its progress towards resolving the differences with the National Coordinating Body of Indigenous Peoples in Panama (COONAPIP) and announced the approval of a no-cost extension of Panama's National UN-REDD Programme until June 2015. The extension was approved together with a review of the new results framework of the Programme and with the full agreement of COONAPIP, who co-presented on a panel with the Government of Panama's National Environment Authority (ANAM) at the Eleventh Meeting of the UN-REDD Programme Policy Board, which took place from 9–10 December 2013 in Geneva.

The UN-REDD Programme Policy Board, composed of representatives of partner countries, indigenous peoples and civil society, donor countries and UN agencies, was deeply appreciative of the progress made in Panama and of the joint efforts of COONAPIP, ANAM and the UN-REDD Programme to resolve the conflict. Members noted that the experiences in Panama provided valuable lessons for other REDD+ countries and highlighted the importance of strong stakeholder engagement processes.
