= Indigenous peoples of Panama =

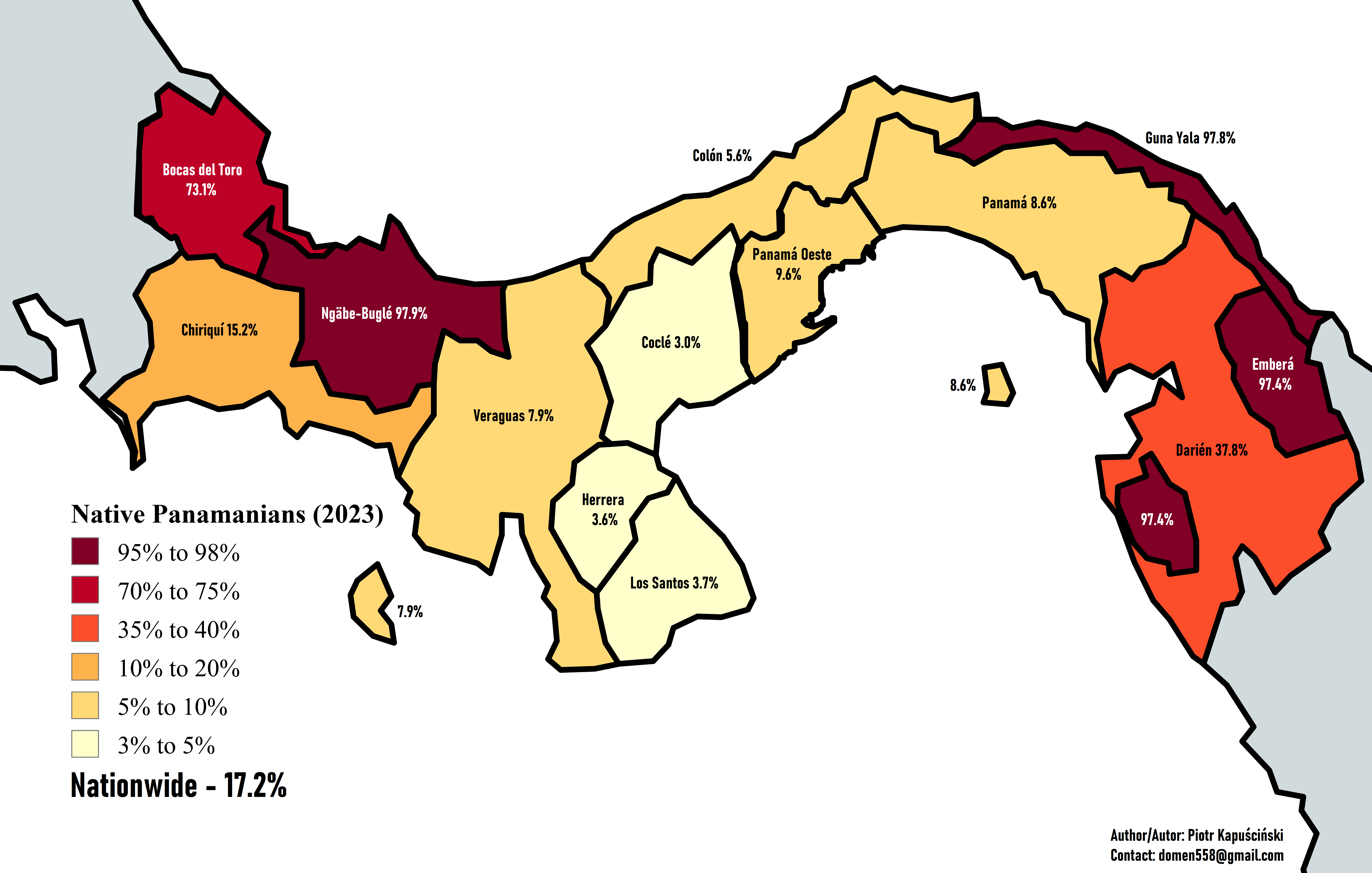
Distribution of Native Panamanians according to the 2023 census

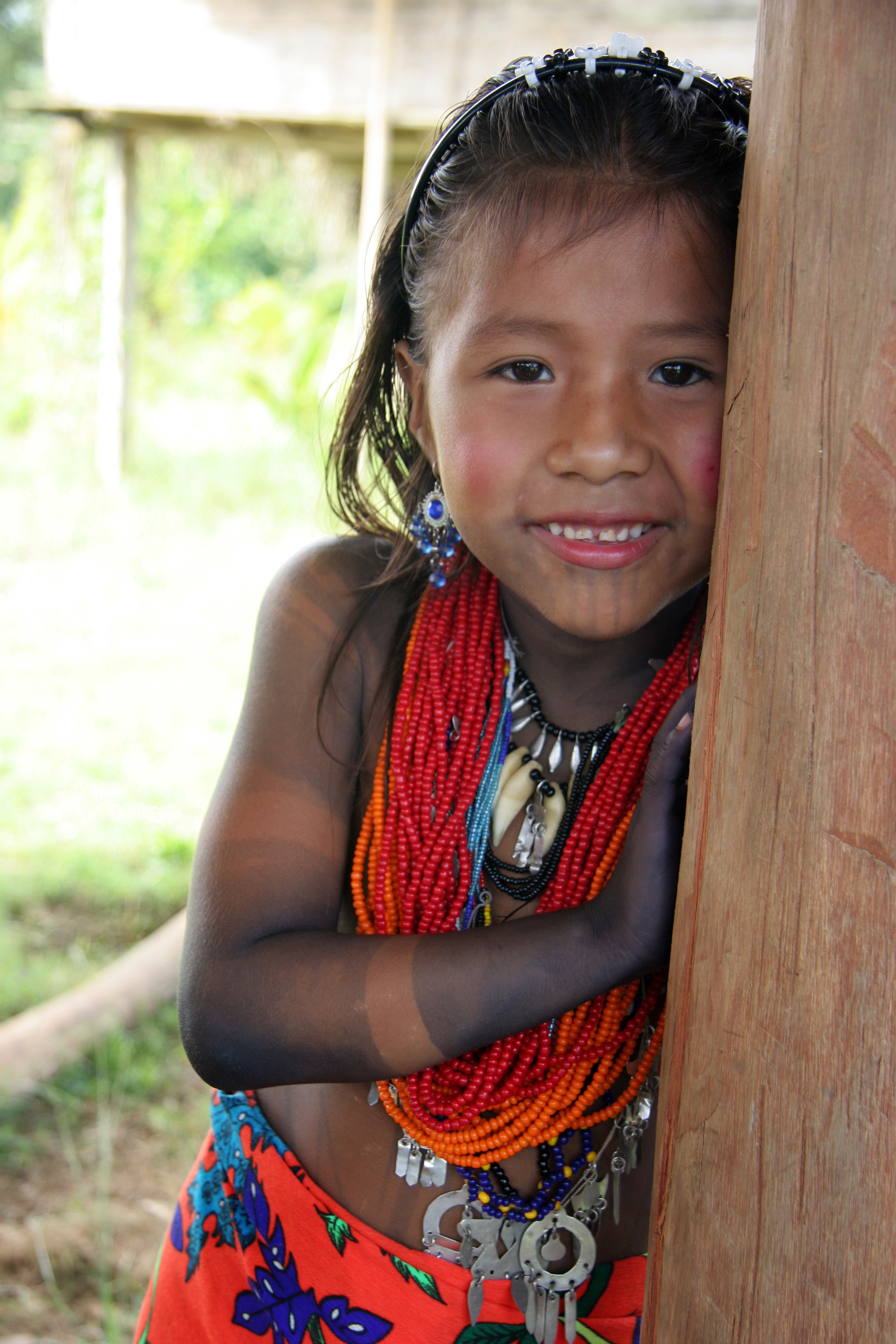
Embera girl, Darién Province, 2006

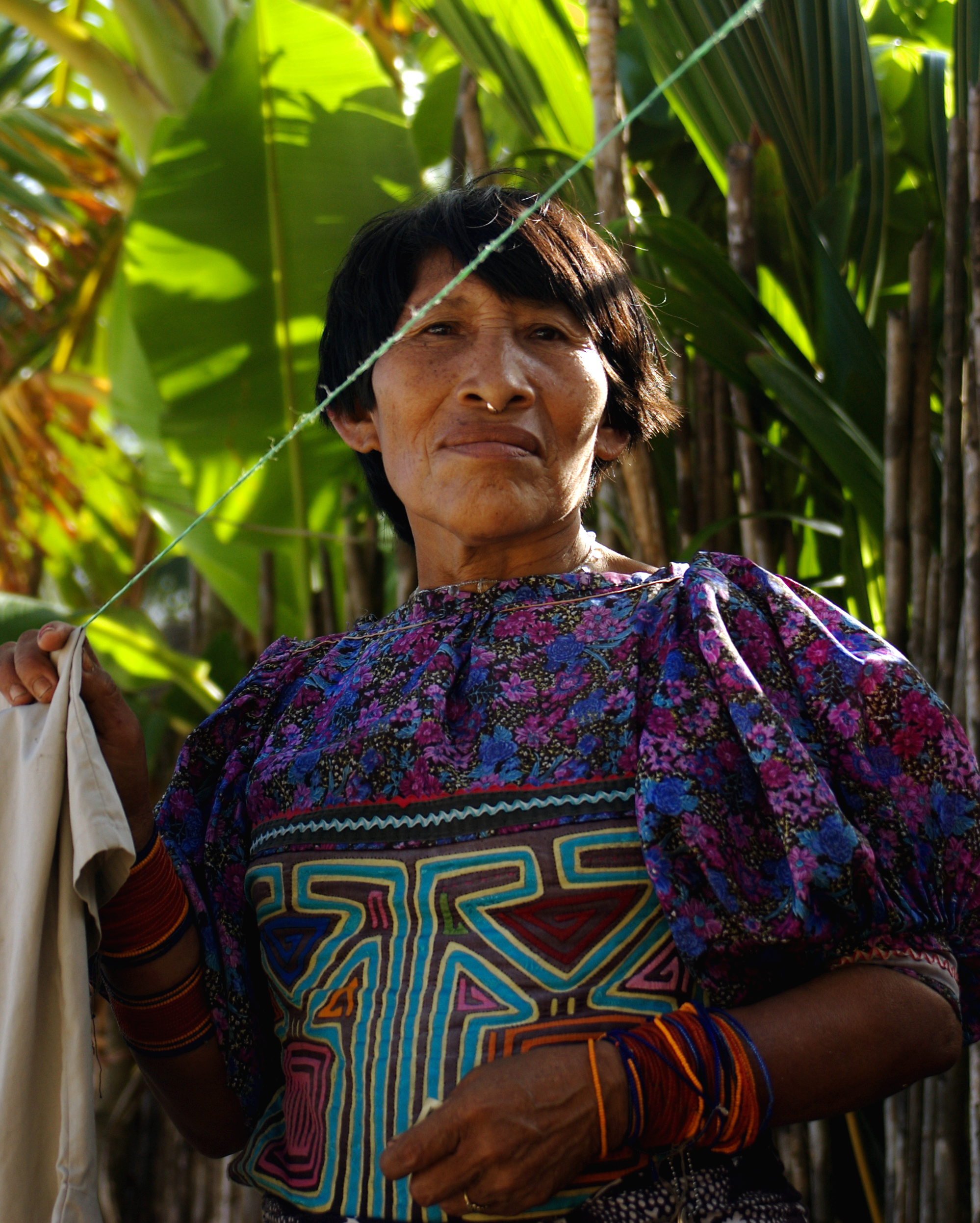
A Guna woman in Guna Yala

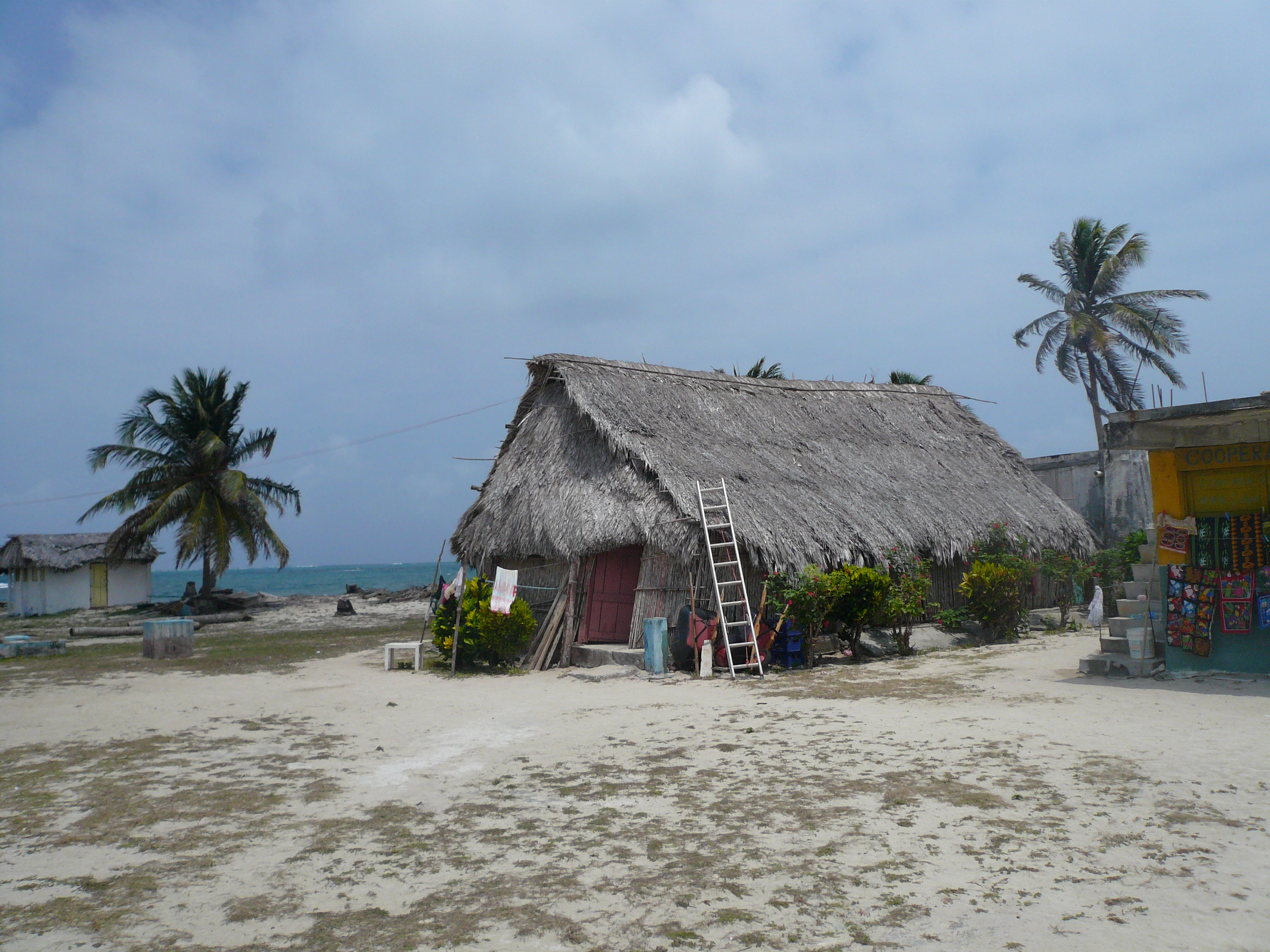
Guna house in Guna Yala, 2007

The Indigenous peoples of Panama, also known as Native Panamanians, are the original inhabitants of Panama, are the Native peoples whose history in the territory of today's Panama predates Spanish colonization. As of the 2023 census, Indigenous peoples constitute 17.2% of Panama's population of 4.5 million, totaling just over 698,000 individuals. There are 7 indigenous peoples. The Ngäbe and Bokota comprise half of the Indigenous peoples of Panama.

Many of the Indigenous Peoples live on comarcas indígenas, which are administrative regions for areas with substantial Indigenous populations. Four comarcas (Emberá-Wounaan, Guna Yala, Naso Tjër Di, and Ngäbe-Buglé) exist as equivalent to a province, with two smaller comarcas (Guna de Madungandí and Guna de Wargandí) subordinate to a province and considered equivalent to a corregimiento (municipality).

They still face challenges, including land usage rights, eviction, poverty, and lack access to things like employment, education, and healthcare.

== Indigenous groups ==
- Bokota, Bocas Del Toro
- Embera, southeastern Darién Province
- Ngäbe (including the Movere and Murire peoples), mainly Chiriquí Province
- Guna, Darién Province and Caribbean side.
- Buglé, mainly Chiriquí Province
- Talamanca
- Teribe
- Wounaan, southeastern Darién Province
- Emberá-Wounaan, mainly Emberá-Wounaan Comarca
- Bribri

== Population ==
Indigenous population of Panama according to ethnic group
Ethnic group	Census 1990		Census 2000		Census 2010		Census 2023	
Ethnic group	Number	%	Number	%	Number	%	Number	%
Ngäbe (Guaymi)	123,626	63.6	169,130	59.3	260,058	62.3	444,878	63.7
Buglé (Bokota)	3,784	1.9	18,724	6.6	26,871	6.4	24,488	3.5
Guna	47,298	24.3	61,707	21.6	80,526	19.3	112,319	16.1
Emberá	14,659	7.5	22,485	7.9	31,284	7.5	51,657	7.4
Wounaan	2,605	1.3	6,882	2.4	7,279	1.7	10,634	1.5
Teribe/Naso	2,194	1.1	3,305	1.2	4,046	1.0	6,899	1.0
Bribri			2,521	0.9	1,068	0.3	799	0.1
Other	103	0.1			460	0.1	45,498	6.5
Not declared			477	0.2	5,967	1.4	975	0.1

== Languages ==
Some native peoples speak Spanish, while many more retain their traditional languages. According to the 2000 census, the following Indigenous languages are spoken in Panama:

- Bokota language: 933 speakers (in Panama)
- Bri-bri language: 2,521 speakers
- Buglé language: 17,731 speakers
- Emberá language: 22,485 speakers
- Guna Language: 61,707 speakers
- Naso-Teribe language: 3,305 speakers
- Ngöbe language: 169,130 speakers
- Wounaan language: 6,882 speakers

== See also ==
- Indigenous peoples
