= Chinese Panamanians =

Panamanian persons (including residents) that are of Chinese origin/descent

巴拿馬華人 Chino-panameños

Total population
- 350,000 (2016); 14% of the Panamanian population

Languages
- Spanish; Hakka; Cantonese; Taishanese; Mandarin; English

Religion
- Buddhism; Christianity

Related ethnic groups
- Asian Latinos; Overseas Chinese

Chinese Panamanians, also referred to as; Spanish: chino-panameños; Chinese: 巴拿馬華人; pinyin: Bānámǎ huárén, are Panamanian citizens and residents of Chinese origin or descent. As of 2003, the community was estimated at between 200,000 and 350,000 people, making it the largest Chinese community in Central America. Around 80% are of Hakka origin, and the remainder are mostly Cantonese and Mandarin speakers.

The first Chinese laborers arrived in 1854 to build the Panama Railroad. By the early 1900s the community dominated retail trade, despite discriminatory laws and taxes. Chinese Panamanian citizenship was revoked in 1941 due to anti-immigrant sentiment, however this was restored in 1946. Immigration resumed in the 1980s following the 1989 Tiananmen Square protests and massacre.

== History ==
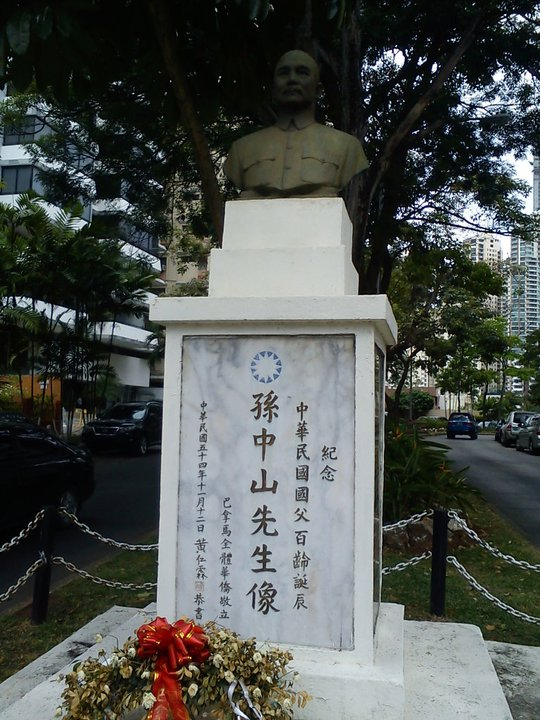
Sun Yat-sen monument, Panama City

=== 1800s—1970s ===
During the Ming and Qing dynasties, many of the Chinese people were experiencing difficulties in their homeland, which led them to leave in search for a better opportunity for their families and themselves.

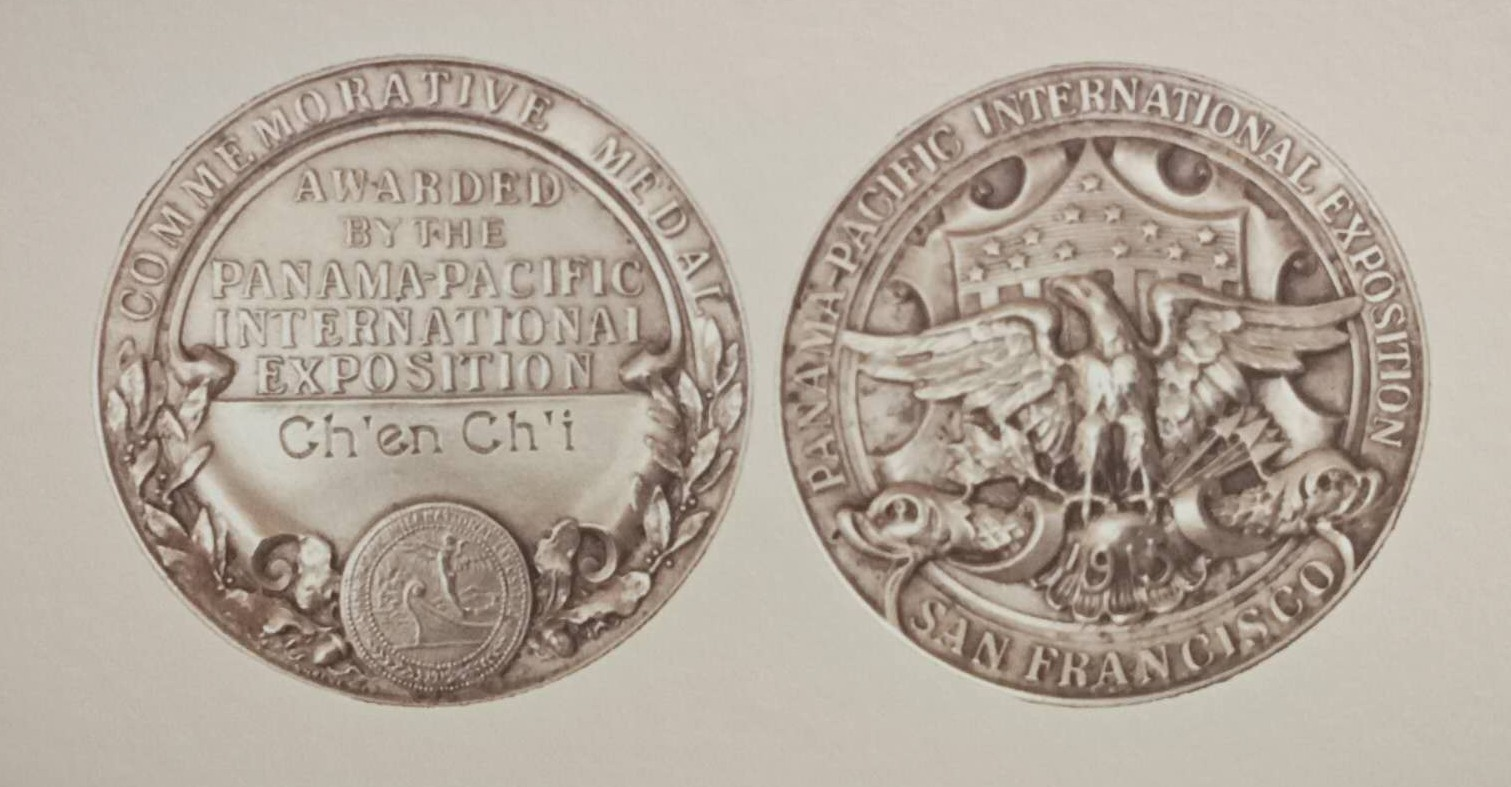
Panama-Pacific International Exposition commemorative medal engraved with Ch'en Ch'i's name, 1915

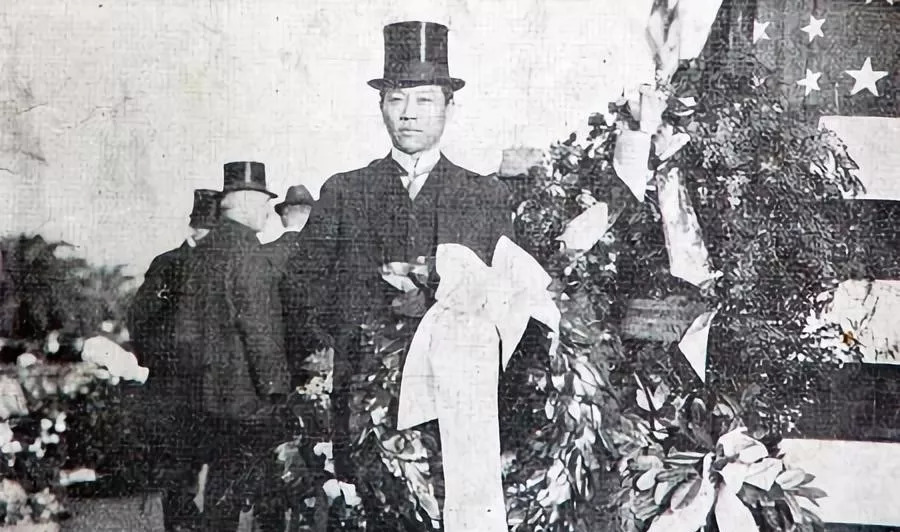
Chen Qi, head of the Chinese delegation and member of the judging committee at the 1915 Panama-Pacific International Exposition.

The Chinese community in Panama began to form in the latter half of the 19th century after the first group of Chinese laborers arrived in the country on March 30,1854 aboard the Clipper Sea Witch to work on the Panama Railroad. Later, many also established in Jamaica.

The Chinese community's labor on the railroad led them into harsh situations, where they faced mistreatment, illness, and dangerous labor. Even though they contributed to the railroad, their efforts were undervalued and unrecognized at the time. Some laborers were addicted to Opium, and many faced poverty conditions and disease during the construction of the Panama Canal.

In the early 1900s, they had played a crucial role in other sectors of the economy as well. They owned over 600 retail stores, and the entire country was said to depend on provisions from their stores. The community faced many challenges, including a 1903 law declaring them as "undesirable citizens", a 1913 head tax, a 1928 law requiring them to submit special petitions in order to become Panamanian citizens, and the subsequent revocation of their citizenship under the 1941 constitution promulgated by Arnulfo Arias. Their citizenship was restored in 1946, under the new constitution which declared all people born in Panama to be citizens.

Mirador de Las Americas Panama: Monument to Chinese involvement in the construction of the Panama Canal. It was torn down by the Panamanian government in 2025.

Chinatown sign at the Old Chinatown in Panama City, Panama

The older Chinatowns, such as the one at Salsipuedes, have become of less importance in the Chinese community though they were described as "hives" of activity in the 1950s and 1960s. The opening of large department stores reduced the importance of Chinese retailers, and as the years went on, many closed their shops; a few retailers of Chinese products remain in the area, staffed by recent immigrants.

Immigration slowed during the 1960s and 1970s. Migration then resumed during the reform and opening up of China, as Deng Xiaoping's government began to relax emigration restrictions.

Lung Fung restaurant in Panama City, Panama

=== 1980s—present ===
In the mid-1980s, when a new wave of Chinese immigrants arrived to Panama, with many illegally migrating. In the aftermath of the Tiananmen Square protests of 1989, many mainland Chinese people fled to Panama by way of Hong Kong on temporary visas and short-term residency permits; estimates of the size of the influx ranged from 9,000 to 35,000. Anti-Chinese sentiment became more mainstream again, and many of the Chinese Panamanian were forced to question their assimilation into Panamanian society.

Tensions have arisen due to external factors including the government of the People's Republic of China vies with the Republic of China on Taiwan for influence among the local Chinese community, hoping to gain formal diplomatic recognition from the Panamanian government. Both sides have funded the building of schools and other community facilities and donated millions of dollars' worth of Chinese textbooks.

President Tsai of Taiwan is warmly welcomed by the people of Panama in 2016

The National Chinese Ethnic Council was created by Law 32 in 2014. The council is made up of nine members, six of which are ethnic Chinese. The first secretary of the council is Juan Tam, and contains representatives of the Ministry of Social Development (MIDES), Ministry of Education (MEDUCA) and Ministry of Culture (MICULTURA).

==== Discrimination of Chinese Panamanians ====
The Chinese Panamanian community has faced racial stereotypes and injustice for many years in Panamá. When Chinese laborers died due to exploitation, violence, poor working conditions or opium addiction, their deaths were not treated equally by Panamanian society. Instead, they were often blamed for their own suffering, with accusations of laziness, weakness or opium addiction.

The Chinese community endured widespread discrimination due to their differences in culture, race, and religion. Although they have lived in Panama for generations, they were still not fully accepted as Panamanian. While West Indian people have often been stereotyped as violent, and the Chinese Panamanians as sneaky or corrupt. Many Chinese men intermarried with Panamanian women to be able to fit into the community, while West Indians in the community tended to marry within their own community.

The Chinese community has often accused of dominating retail trade in Panamá. At one point, they owned nearly 38.34% of retail commerce compared to 38.88% owned by Panamanians.

== Demographics ==
One hundred thousand Chinese, who are naturalized or born Panamanian . . . while feeling proud or their race or their ethnicity, have united, come together and melted in Panama’s pot that ultimately has produced a rich and collective Panamanian identity.

— Eustorgio Chon — Panamanian writer — "Race and Ethnicity in the formation of Panamanian National Identity: Panamanian Discrimination Against Chinese and West Indians in the Thirties."

As of 2003, there were estimated to be between 200,000 and 350,000 ethnically Chinese people in Panamá. 80,000 of these being immigrants from mainland China, and 300 from Taiwan. Around 80% of this population are of Hakka origin, with the rest being Cantonese and Mandarin speakers. This would make them the largest Chinese community in Central America. At this time, there were thirty-five separate ethnic representative organizations for the group.

== Notable individuals ==
- Jose Bernal
- Jorge Cham, web comic creator of Piled Higher and Deeper
- Bruce Chen, professional baseball pitcher
- Roberto Chen, Panamanian footballer of Chinese descent
- Federico Fong, musician (of Chinese-Panamanian father and American mother)
- Marelissa Him, model, part Chinese on her father's side
- Shey Ling Him Gordon, Panama's delegate to the Miss World 2007 competition
