= Ngäbere =

Chibchan language spoken in Central America

- Movere, Guaymi
- Ngäbere
- Pronunciation: [ŋɔˈbeɾe]
- Native to: Panama, Costa Rica
- Region: Central America
- Ethnicity: Ngäbe
- Native speakers: 170,000 (2012 census)
- Language family: Chibchan: Isthmic; Guaymí–Guna; Guaymi; Ngäbere
- Writing system: Latin

Language codes
- ISO 639-3: gym
- Glottolog: ngab1239
- ELP: Guaymí
- Linguasphere: 81-ECA-a
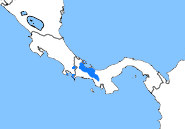

Ngäbere, also known as Guaymí, Movere, Chiriquí, and Valiente, is a Chibchan language spoken by the Indigenous Ngäbe people in Panama and Costa Rica. The people refer to themselves as Ngäbe ([ˈŋɔbe]) and to their language as Ngäbere [ŋɔˈbeɾe]. The Ngäbes are the most populous of Panama's several Indigenous peoples. The language is centered in Panama within the semi-autonomous Indigenous reservation known as the Comarca Ngäbe-Buglé. Beginning in the 1950s, Costa Rica began to receive Ngäbe immigrants, where they are found in several Indigenous reservations: Abrojos Montezuma, Conteburica, Coto Brus, Guaymí de Alto Laguna de Osa, and Altos de San Antonio.

== Language family ==
Ngäbere is part of the Chibchan language family, which is Indigenous to an area that extends from eastern Honduras to northern Colombia. Ngäbere is one of two languages classified under a group called Guaymí. The other is a related but mutually unintelligible language called Buglere, spoken by the Buglé people within the Comarca Ngäbe-Buglé.

While all varieties of Ngäbere are grammatically identical and mutually intelligible, there are phonological and lexical differences that vary from region to region. The people of different regions may use different words for the same concept or pronounce the same word differently. Vowel sounds may change; for example, the word for “to see” that is pronounced /toen/ in some regions may be pronounced /tuen/ in other areas; the word for “you” may be pronounced /mä/ or /ma/ depending on the region. Syllable stress may also vary regionally—for instance, the word for “dove,” ütü, may be pronounced with the accent on the first syllable, or with equal strong accents on both syllables, depending on the speaker's region. Penonomeño was somewhat more distinct, but is no longer spoken.

Ngäbere is directly referred to as dialecto (dialect) frequently by both Ngäbes and Latinos. Rolando Rodríguez remarks on this misnomer: “El ngäbere no es una variedad del español o de otra lengua conocida, de manera que por desconocimiento se suele decir dialecto al ngäbere, cuando en realidad es una lengua.” (Ngäbere is not a variety of Spanish or of any other known language. Through ignorance people usually call Ngäbere “dialect,” when in reality it is a language.)

== Phonology and Orthography ==
=== Consonants ===
		Bilabial	Alveolar	Postalveolar/ Palatal	Velar		Glottal
		Bilabial	Alveolar	Postalveolar/ Palatal	plain	lab.	Glottal
Nasal		m	n	ɲ	ŋ	ŋʷ	
Plosive/ Affricate	voiceless		t	t͡ʃ	k	kʷ	
Plosive/ Affricate	voiced	b	d	d͡ʒ	ɡ	ɡʷ	
Fricative			s				h
Trill			r				
Approximant		w	l				

=== Vowels ===
	Front	Central	Back	
Close	i		ɯ	u
Close-mid	e		ɤ	o
Open-mid			ɔ	
Open		a		

As a traditionally oral language, the Ngäbere writing system has only very recently been created. An alphabet was developed using the Latin script, based on the Spanish alphabet. Given that Spanish is the most widely used language in the Central American region, the alphabet was based on the Spanish alphabet in the attempt to create a closer sense of correlation between the two languages.

Some features of the alphabet are as follows:

- In the case of nasalized vowels and diphthongs, an ⟨n⟩ is collocated after the nucleus. For example, /kï/ is written ⟨kün⟩.
- In the case of the phonetic sound [k] and [ɡ], and [kʷ] and [ɡʷ] appearing in the middle of a word, the symbols used are ⟨k⟩ and ⟨kw⟩ although it is pronounced as [ɡ] and [ɡʷ]. In a similar manner, when a ⟨t⟩ appears in the middle of a word, it is pronounced as [d]. Therefore, a word such as ⟨kwete⟩ is pronounced [kwede], and ⟨mike⟩ is pronounced [miɡe].
- In the case of labialized consonants, the grapheme ⟨w⟩ has been collocated after the consonants where the labialization occurs.
- The allophones of the consonants /b d ɡ r/ are /β ð ɣ ɾ/.
- The Spanish graphemes are used for [t͡ʃ] ⟨ch⟩, [ĵ] ⟨y⟩, [h] ⟨j⟩. The Spanish ⟨ñ⟩ is also used for the corresponding phoneme ɲ.
- In accordance with the system designed by Arosemena and Javilla, the phonemes /ï/, /ë/ and /ʚ/ are represented with the graphemes ⟨ü⟩, ⟨ö⟩, and ⟨ä⟩ respectively.
- The velar consonant phoneme ŋ is represented by the grapheme ⟨ng⟩
- Some letters in the Spanish alphabet are not present in the Ngäbere alphabet, such as ⟨c⟩ and ⟨q⟩, ⟨p⟩, ⟨v⟩, ⟨x⟩, and ⟨z⟩, whose Spanish values either do not exist in Ngäbere or are represented by other letters. Loan words containing the phone [p], which does not exist in Ngäbere, are modified to /b/, such as /ban/ for “pan” (bread), and /bobre/ for “pobre” (poor)

Standardization of spelling has been slow to solidify after the creation of a writing system, especially regarding the transcription of vowels. This appears to have been influenced by the different alphabets and pronunciation of the various Spanish and English speaking researchers attempting to create a representation that corresponds to the spelling system in their language. For example, the word Ngäbe has been recurrently and erroneously spelled “Ngöbe” by many people, Latino and Ngäbe alike, because the phoneme /ä/ is heard and reproduced by Spanish speakers as /o/, and therefore they attempt to write it that way while continuing to acknowledge that it is in fact a different phoneme than the Spanish /o/. Along the same lines, Ngäbe has been spelled “Ngawbe” by numerous English speakers to reconcile English spelling and the pronunciation. Words that should be written with ⟨t⟩ or ⟨k⟩ in the middle of the word have also been the subject of non-standard spelling, since many write the word as it is pronounced rather than following the spelling rule. For the purposes of this article, all spelling will attempt to follow the standard writing and phonetics system.

The accent system generally puts the primary accent on the penultimate syllable of words, although there many exceptions. A monosyllabic word always features a primary or strong accent. In a bisyllabic word the accent can fall on either syllable. In words of three or four syllables the primary accent often appears in the first or second syllable; in the rare longer word of three or more syllables, sometimes two primary accents may appear. The tone is slightly higher on the primary accent than on the rest of the word.

Ngäbere is largely a monotonous language, with few extreme fluctuations in tone. To listen to a recorded sample of the language, visit Global Recordings Network, where they have recordings of messages and songs created for the purpose of Evangelical missionary work, as well as the English scripts.

== Grammar ==
=== Sentence structure ===
The word order of the Ngäbere sentence generally follows a Subject – Object – Verb pattern, which is a common feature of Chibchan languages.

Ti aro kwete.
I rice eat
SUB OBJ VERB
"I eat rice"

Young and Givón describe the sentence features in which Ngäbere differs from typical S–O–V languages:

"Although the language bears the unmistakable marks of an SOV language, auxiliaries and modality verbs precede – rather than follow – their compliments. This also extends to the negative marker, which precedes the auxiliary verb (or the main verb in the absence of auxiliary). This feature of Ngäbére word order is at variance with the normal pattern of rigid SOV languages. Among Chibchan languages, some follow the Ngäbére word order pattern; others display a more conservative SOV pattern, with auxiliaries and modality verbs following their verbal compliments; while others yet display both patterns." (Emphasis in the original)

“An O – V – S order does occur, and is probably a contrastive-object device akin to English Y-movement. When this order occurs, however, the subject must be case-marked.". Similarly to Korean, another SOV language, “a ‘topic’ suffix may also partake in marking the contrasted noun phrase.”

Additionally, in the passive voice the word order takes on an S – V – O arrangement, much like in English except that the auxiliary verb is placed after the main verb.

Ye miga ta sete kwe.
SUB VERB-PASS AUX ADV PN-AGENT
"This was put here by him."

The auxiliary verbs carry the timed or finite verbal inflections, while the complement verbs carry an untimed or non-finite inflection.

Negative sentences are most commonly formed in the arrangement of S + Negative + (Auxiliary) + (Object) + Verb.

Ti ñan reba näen mäbe.
I not can go you+with
"I can’t go with you."

Tikwe ñaka ye noaema.
I+AGENT not that did
"I didn't do that."

The negative marker precedes the finite verb.

Ti ñan rika.
1SG NEG go-EXCLAM
I'm not going!

Kä ñaka nibi toen tie
Place NEG can-NF see-NF 1SG-DAT
“I can't see.” or literally, “The place is not visible to me.”

Ngäbere is a split-ergative language. It also displays a number of suffixal tense-aspect-modality markers, as well as suffixal case markers and adposistions. These suffixes are attached to nouns and verbs. When used in the perfect aspect to indicate a nominative case, the suffix -kwe is used to show agency for transitive subjects. In the imperfect aspect, -kwe also is used to indicate possession (see noun clauses).

The marker -e shows dative joining with verbs that show mental state (and may also be used to show possession):

Ñakare gare tie.
NEG VERB-understand PN+DAT
“I don’t understand.”

Ñantörö mäe.
Greeting PN+DAT
“Hello to you.”

Each Ngäbere suffix has a variety of meanings. Some of the most frequently used suffixes and their English equivalents are as follows. The suffix –be expresses “with,” “only,” or an immediate reaction. The suffix –btä expresses “over,” “to be in,” “going to,” “and,” “also,” and time. The suffix –bti expresses “over,” above,” “on top of,” “by,” “in,” “through,” “then,” “after,” “plus” (indicates addition or sum), “with” (indicates instrument), and “behind”

=== Noun phrases ===
Nouns may be formed by combining two nouns or a noun with a verb:

Kräkä + dianka = {kräka dianka}
medicine {} gatherer {} {“medicine man”}

Nouns may also be derived by placing a suffix at the end of another word:

gore (to rob) + -gä = gogä (robber)
Ngäbe (person) + -re = Ngäbere (Ngäbe language)

Ngäbere contains many polysemic words, meaning that the same word often has many different meanings. For example, the word kä denotes name, earth, year, climate, and place, depending on context. Other examples are sö (moon, month, tobacco), kukwe (language, word, topic, issue, roast, burn), kri (tree, large), tö (mind, intelligence, to want, summer), and tare (pain, difficulty, love)

The regular noun phrase consists of the nucleus (head noun or pronoun) followed by the possible addition of a modifier, quantifier, or demonstrative. Articles are not used in Ngäbere.

Monso chi iti
child small one
A small child

Mrö ñakare
Food none
No food

Ñö mrene krubäte
Water salty very
Very salty water

Mütü kri ye
Pig large that
That large pig

'Plurality'

All nouns are countable in Ngäbere. To form a plural noun in reference to humans, -tre is added:

meri (woman) = meritre (women)

In reference to non-human entities, such as animals and other objects, -krä is added:

Kwi (chicken) = kwikrä (chickens).

'Personal pronouns'

Ti I
Mä you
Niara he, she
Nun we
Mun you (plural)
Niaratre they

'Reflexive pronouns'

Reflexivity and reciprocity is marked with ja. Ja tikekä means “to cut onself.” Mete means “to hit,” but when ja is added, ja mete means “to fight.” Ja may also indicate possession, as in the case of ja gwriete, “one’s own house.”

'Demonstrative pronouns'

Ne This (object is close to the speaker)
Ye That (object is far from the speaker but close to the listener)
Se That (object is far from both speaker and listener)

The demonstrative pronouns are modified by the suffix of location –te and –kware to create adverbs and prepositions of location:

Nete Here
Yete There
Sete Way over there
Negware Toward here
Segware Toward there

'Possessive'

There are no possessive pronouns. Possession is marked depending on the order of possessor and possessed. The suffix –kwe is added to nouns or pronouns to show non-inherent possession (such as possession of objects, animals, political relations, etc.) in order of possessed/possessor.

Tikwe my, mine
Mäkwe yours
Niarakwe his, her, hers
Nunkwe our, ours
Munkwe your, yours (plural)
Niaratrekwe theirs

Minchi Mariakwe Maria's cat
Mrö monsokwe the child's food
Meye mäkwe your mother
Nukro tikwe my dog

Non-inherent possession can also be shown in the possessor/possessed by adding the suffix -e.

Ti jue my house

Possession is also shown by placing a personal pronoun or noun in front of an inherently possessed object (family members, body parts, etc.).

Ti run my father
Mä eteba your brother
Samuel okwä Samuel's eye

Double possession uses both structures:

Kä mundiaka etebakwe the hunter's brother's land
Ju ti rünkwe my father's house

=== Verbs ===
Ngäbere verbs do not need to agree with their subject — verbs are inflected only for tense, not person. “Ngäbere verbs do not display subject or object agreement. In this way they differ from verbs in related Chibchan languages”. While the verbs are conjugated solely in respect to time, linguistic treatment of time is somewhat more complex in Ngäbere than in English. According to Kopesec, there are two broad categories of time, actual and potential. Actual refers to an action that has happened or has begun to happen, while potential refers to an action that is projected or intended. Furthermore, there are two other categories that verbs may be placed in, limited or unlimited. A limited verb is not currently in progress, which implies an end point or completion in the case of actual verbs, or a future beginning point in the case of potential verbs. An unlimited verb is currently in progress during a specific scenario, and the beginning or end point is not implied.

One more distinction made by the Ngäbere concept of time is linguistically differentiating between the near past and the remote past, as well as the near future and the remote future. Generally speaking the close or recent past may be considered during the same day as the present time. Farther back in the past should be expressed using the remote past. Verbs are conjugated by taking the root of the verb and adding a suffix. The suffixes for recent and remote past change depending on the root class, but the future suffixes remain the same for all root classes.

For example, the verb mike (to put) can be conjugated in the following ways by taking the root mika and adding suffixes. It may be translated into English by adding an adverbial phrase to express the implied actual or potential time.

Limited

Niarakwe jodron ye miri sete. "He put it there (not long ago)." Action recently completed
Niarakwe jodron ye mikaba sete. "He put it there (a long time ago)." Action completed long ago
Niarakwe jodron ye mikadi sete. "He will put it there (soon)." Action to take place shortly.
Niarakwe jodron ye mikai sete. "He will put it there (much later)." Action to take place in remote future

Unlimited

Niarakwe jodron ye mike sete. "He puts it there (right now)." Present action

OR "He is putting it there (right now)." Present continuous action

Jodron ye mika ta sete kwe. "It was put there by him." Passive voice
Niarakwe jodron ye mikadre sete. "He has to put it there (now)." Present obligation
Niarakwe jodron ye mikabare sete. "They say that he put it there." External testimony of

others

Jodron ye mikani sete niarakwe. "It has been put there by him." Completed action that has

continuing effect

Verbs are divided for conjugation rules in categories depending on the ending of the verbs and the nasal quality of the vowels.

Auxiliary verbs are used to describe movement, state, and change of state. For example:

Ti nikira jüben. I am going (right now) to bathe.
Ti bi niken. I am going.
Niara reba blite kuin. She can speak well.
Ti niki ngin den. I am going to get firewood.

== Demographics ==
The total population of those who identified themselves as Ngäbe in the 2010 Panamanian National Census was 260,058. The population of speakers in Costa Rica in the year 2000 was 5,090, with a total ethnic population of 5,360. It must be kept in mind that the number of speakers of Ngäbere is somewhat lower than the ethnic population, given the fact that many younger people today are not learning the language. Oftentimes people of Indigenous descent who do not speak the Indigenous language do not consider themselves to be “Indians” but rather identify themselves as Latino or campesino. Before the formation of the Comarca Ngäbe-Buglé, census figures for Ngäbe population were based on whether or not they spoke the native language.

== History ==
The Ngäbe people and language have been historically referred to by Latinos as Guaymí, although in recent years the use of Ngäbe and Ngäbere has become prevalent. It is not clear where the name Guaymí originated, although there has been speculation. One such theory is that the term was derived from the Buglere word ngwamigda, which means “Indigenous.” Rolando Rodríguez offers another theory of the origin of the words Guaymí and Bogotá in reference to the Ngäbe and Buglé peoples, respectively, that the terms come from both the Ngäbere and Buglere languages:

La historia de los grupos indígenas revela una continua rivalidad manifestada de diferentes formas, pero unas de las formas reveladoras de rivalidad es la forma verbal, es decir, una guerra verbal que se caracteriza por el sarcasmo, la ironía, y la ofensa utilizando palabras, una vez superando las tensiones de la luchas los ngäbe y buglé. En algún momento de la historia hicieron alianza como estrategia de defensa ante otro grupo de indígenas pero en esta convivencia cada uno decía ser mejor que el otro. Los ngäbes llamaron a los buglé bobotas o bokotas para ofenderlos, para decir que eran como unos sapos, y los buglé utilizaron la palabra gwarare, o gwa minta, que significa como lombrices. Los contactos latinos con los grupos indígenas ratificaron que se les llamaba bokotas o guaymíes y así se escribieron los libros. Pero ahora ninguna de esas palabras designa a ninguno de los dos grupos.
(The history of the indigenous groups reveals a continual rivalry manifested in different forms, but one of the revealing forms of rivalry is the verbal form-- that is to say, a verbal war which is characterized by sarcasm, irony, and offense using words, at one point overcoming the tensions in the struggles of the Ngäbe and Buglé. At some moment in history they made an alliance as a defense strategy against another indigenous group, but in this fellowship each one said that they were better than the other. The Ngäbes called the Buglés bobotas or bokotas to offend them, to say that they were like toads, and the Buglés used the word gwarare, or gwa minta, which means worms. The contacts made by Latinos with the indigenous groups confirmed that the other group was called Bokotas or Guaymíes, and so the books were written. But now neither of these words designates either of the two groups.)

== Cultural language use ==
Vagueness and long silences are normal and acceptable in communication. In fact, it is considered impolite if one does not give another enough time to consider his words before speaking.

It is typical to greet one another or pass the time while working by making a noise known in Spanish as a saloma or grito.

Word play is common, where double and even triple meanings may be implied.

== Names and kinship terms ==
Ngäbe proper names typically do not refer to any object, natural or otherwise—for the most part they are just names. Some examples of male names are Oli, Chíton, Chä, Niti, Ima, Nicho, Ulira, and Itikän. Examples of female names are Besikó, Ei, Bei, Bechi, Belikó, Meti, Mesi, and Tu Last names are determined by where a person is from. Traditionally the Ngäbes lived in small hamlets as family units, and the name of this place was their family name. Stemming from the influence of Christian missionaries grouping the people into tighter communities, today it is more common to live in larger communities, though the last name is still determined by the name of the town.

Most Ngäbes have two names, their Ngäbe name and their Spanish name. The Spanish name is their legal name and is used for all official documentation and during much of everyday life. In recent times, the use of Ngäbe names is often pushed aside, especially in front of outsiders. On the other hand, Ngäbes love to bestow Ngäbe names on trusted outsiders to share their culture and indicate acceptance, and will refer to that person exclusively by his or her Ngäbe name.

Ngäbe communities also have two names, one in Spanish and one in Ngäbere, which often correspond with each other, but not always. For example, "Cerro Otoe" (Otoe Mountain) and "Tätobta" (Beside Otoe Peak), "Llano Ñopo" (Spaniard Plain) and "Suliakwatabti" (On top of Spaniard Plain/Flesh). Many other communities have place names that are either untranslatable proper nouns or names whose translations have been lost. Examples include "Kinkinbta" ("Peña Blanca" or "White Cliff" in Spanish), Kaninbta ("Hato Pilón" or "Rice Mortar Ranch"), and Ünbti ("Hato Chamí" or "Chamí Ranch").

Kinship terms are quite broad and often can be applied to many types of relationships, depending on where the person falls in the kinship network. P.D. Young wrote an ethnography in the 1960s which offers, among other things, an in-depth analysis of the complexity of kinship relations. Kinship terms often depend on the sex of the speaker. For example, the words for “brother” and “sister” are determined by the sex of both siblings. Eteba is a sibling of the same sex, and ngwae is a sibling of the opposite sex. Therefore, if the speaker is male, his brother would be eteba and his sister ngwae; if the speaker is female, her brother would be ngwae and her sister eteba. However, both these terms could also be applied to what in English would be known as “cousin” or “second cousin.” There are also vocative and non-vocative kinship terms, depending on whether one is speaking directly to the relative or simply referring to them. Traditionally a man was not supposed to speak directly to his u, or father-in-law, and me, mother-in-law, although he was bound in service to them in return for marrying their daughter. Therefore, in this case there are no vocative terms because the duana, “son-in-law,” was not supposed to directly address them.

== Useful phrases ==
The following list of phrases is likely to be useful for a visitor to the Comarca Ngäbe-Buglé. Oftentimes locals will greet foreigners in Ngäbere to test them. They are very impressed and culturally validated by simple exchanges with foreigners in Ngäbere.

Ñantörö Hello
Köbö kuin dekä (dere, deu) Good morning (afternoon, evening)
Dre kukwe (“dre gwe”) What's up?
Basakukwe. Visiting.
Mä kä ño? What is your name?
Ti kä … My name is ...
Mä niki medente? Where are you going?
Ti niki sete. I'm going over there.
Ti ta basare. I am visiting.
Mä medente? Where are you from?
Ti Estados Unidosbu. I am from the United States.
Jän Yes
Ñakare No
Mä tua ño? How are you?
Ti ta kuin I am fine.
Ja tuaita See you.
Ngöbö rika mäbe May God go with you.

== Cultural customs ==
- 'Juride' To harvest someone else's land because you helped to plant it (or with the expectation that you will allow them to harvest from your land in return)
- 'Dö' An alcoholic beverage usually of corn (in Spanish, chicha fuerte)
- 'Kra' Chácara, a traditional bag woven from natural fibers or sewn with purchased threads.
- 'Krün' Balsería, a seasonal gathering of several communities that traditionally involves a game where men throw large balsawood sticks at the legs of opponents. In past times food was prepared for the invited guest community, marriage arrangements were made, stories were told, and grievances were aired by fist fights. In current times it is mainly an opportunity to drink exorbitant amounts of chicha, fight, and throw the balsa.
- 'Mägän' Puberty ritual for girls (no longer practiced frequently). Upon having her first menstruation, a girl was taken into isolation and ritually bathed. She was taught how to be a woman by an old woman in the community, who instructed her how to behave for her husband and how to make chácaras.
- 'Grä' Puberty ritual for boys, in which they were taken out into the wilderness by an elder who taught them how to be men and how to make hats.

== The influence of Spanish on Ngäbere ==
Spanish is the language of education and government, and is the lingua franca for contact with outsiders. Ngäbere has borrowed many words from Spanish, and to a lesser extent from English. The sounds of the loan words are often nasalized, voiced, or de-voiced, in order to conform to Ngäbere phonology. K. Bletzer Bletzer argues that

"the phoneticized words can expect to have meaning within the Ngawbere language (semanticization) that extends beyond or embellishes the original meaning in the foreign language. This particularly is true when the introduced objects (or concepts) are associated with similar objects (or concepts) or strategic importance to Ngawbere culture, that is, the borrowed word will carry a high semantic load in terms of the more salient values of Ngawbere culture."

Since most Ngäbere words end in vowel sounds, foreign words ending in consonants are often stripped of their final consonants or adorned with a final vowel. Internal consonants are also softened. (ex. Jesus → Jesu, arroz “rice” → aro, carro “car” → caro, cruz “cross” → kruso). Many of the loan words are household objects or technologies that were brought in by outsiders (ex. celular “cell phone,” mesa “table”). In addition to using loan words, bilingual Ngäbes conversing with each other often code switch between Spanish and Ngäbere within the same conversation or even the same sentence.

The Ngäbere alphabet was designed taking into consideration the differences between Spanish and Ngäbere, and the need to reconcile these differences. Costa Rican linguist Barbara Lininger notes a tension between the two languages with “la presencia del español como lengua de cultura predominante, o al menos coexistente en la región. Dicho factor causa un conflicto debido a las grandes diferencias que existen entre los dos idiomas” (the presence of Spanish as the language of predominant culture, or at least coexistent in the region. Said factor causes a conflict due to the great differences that exist between the two languages)

The Ngäbe people's feelings about the Latinos can be seen in how they initially called their invaders: Sulia, which is a kind of small cockroach. The Spanish language is therefore called Suliare, which means to speak like a cockroach. By the same token, Ngäbes have long been the recipient of sustained racism from the Latinos. The language use and education of Ngäbere in the home has been heavily diminished by cause of several factors, including the socialization to be embarrassed of Ngäbe language and culture because of racism and low self-esteem. The use of the word dialecto, which often used to label the language, is considered demeaning:

La palabra dialecto se suele utilizar con sentido discriminatorio u ofensivo para disminuir el valor de la cultura o de los hablantes. Esto producía un efecto negativo en la autoestima de los Ngäbes por mucho tiempo, cuyo impacto se podía ver cuando un Ngäbe prefería abstenerse de hablar frente a persona de otro grupo cultural por pena. Pero ahora se observa un proceso de recuperación de la autoestima, y la gente tiene más confianza en sí misma y en el valor de su cultura, y por ende en el idioma.

(The word “dialect” usually is used with a discriminatory or offensive meaning to diminish the value of the culture or of the speakers. This produced a negative effect in the self-esteem of the Ngäbes for a long time, whose impact could be seen when a Ngäbe preferred to abstain from speaking in front of a person of another cultural group because of embarrassment. But now a process of recuperation of self-esteem is observed, and the people have more confidence in themselves and in the value of their culture, and ultimately in the language.)

Language loss has also occurred because of the very education that has helped a select few Ngäbes move ahead in a Spanish-speaking world. Rodriguez points out:

Hay un fenómeno que quisiera resaltar y es el hecho de que al iniciarse la década de los 80 los estudiantes Ngäbes que tuvieron la oportunidad de estudiar en las escuelas, colegios y universidades han estado en menos contacto con la práctica de las costumbres, tradiciones orales y el idioma hablado y no tienen tanta habilidad para recordar y practicar las costumbres y el idioma. Los niños de las generaciones nuevas no tienen habilidad para hablar en Ngäbere.
(There is a phenomenon that I would like to highlight, and it is the fact that at the beginning of the 80’s, the Ngäbe students that had the chance to study in the elementary schools, high schools, and universities have been in less contact with the practice of the customs, oral traditions, and the spoken language, and don’t have as much ability to remember and practice the customs and language. The children of the new generations don’t have the ability to speak in Ngäbere.)

Often parents want their children to speak Spanish in order to have more success in life. Even when Ngäbere is still spoken in the home it is not uncommon for children to answer their parents’ Ngäbere questions in Spanish. Spanish is spoken almost exclusively at school, and even on the playground. The result is that many in the younger generations are not learning the language, and those who have not learned it can't pass it on to their children. Although the language is not in immediate danger of extinction, there is a chance that in the future if this trend continues it could be in danger.

Due to growing concern about the future of the language and culture, there has been a recent resurgence in cultural pride, even a reclamation of sorts of a position of power: “En término general los Ngäbes se sienten orgullosos de su cultura y de su idioma. [Ahora] se sienten más cómodos de hablar y practicar los elementos de las costumbres y tradiciones, como los bailes, y decir sus nombres en Ngäbere sin pena.” (In general terms the Ngäbes feel proud of their culture and language. They [now] feel more comfortable speaking and practicing the elements of their customs and traditions, such as the dances, and say their names in Ngäbere without shame.”

== Education ==
Until recent decades, it was nearly unheard of for a Ngäbe to receive an education past primary school. Although there are definitely more educational opportunities now than in the past, there is still much wanting in the education of Ngäbe children. According to the Minority Rights Group International, only 18% of children ages 15–19 in the Comarca Ngäbe-Buglé receive schooling beyond sixth grade, compared to the national average of 65%.

Although education through ninth grade is free and compulsory, it is difficult for many Ngäbe children to attend school. Many live in remote areas too far away to attend school, and some walk up to three hours and back every day to attend classes. Many families do not have enough money to buy uniforms or notebooks for their children. Although the government offers welfare programs such as La Red de Oportunidades (Network of Opportunities) which gives women with children $50 a month that is supposed to help out with education expenses, oftentimes those resources are spent before they are even received. Even if children are able to attend school they usually receive a subpar education, since the least experienced(and sometimes most disgruntled) teachers often get sent to work in difficult access schools. If a small percentage of Ngäbes graduate from high school, a minuscule amount (less than 1%) is able to receive a higher education.

Due to these factors, the majority of those who are technically literate are still very poorly educated, and are often looked down upon by other Panamanians in part because of their poor Spanish skills and lack of education. The elderly and women are more likely to be illiterate, and many old women do not even speak Spanish at all. As such, these people are less likely to know how and through which channels to petition aid from the government or become self-sufficient workers within the Panamanian economy. Even more seriously, “Due to inadequate education and poor Spanish language skills members of this group are often unaware of their rights and fail to employ legal channels when threatened” by outside coercions from mining and power companies, and the like.

According to the Panamanian National Institute of Statistics and Census, the percentage of illiteracy in the Comarca Ngäbe Buglé fell from 45.9% in 2000 to 30.8% in 2010; although a significant improvement, it is still much a much higher rate than in the rest of Panama, with women having a higher illiteracy rate than men. These numbers refer only to Spanish literacy. Most Ngäbes are illiterate in Ngäbere, since it is traditionally an oral language. Learning to read Ngäbere is not a priority to most Ngäbes, since there is a more urgent need for literacy in Spanish. As well, there is still the ever-present cultural stigma attached to the language that may be affecting the impetus of Ngäbere as a written language. Rodríguez) observes that “la gente en general está enfocando su interés otra vez en el idioma pero no tiene habilidad para leer su propio idioma y al hacerlo les da pena.” (The people in general are again focusing their interest in the language, but they don't have the ability to read their own language and they are embarrassed doing it).

Comarca law stipulates that there must be a bilingual Spanish/Ngäbere education. However, in practice there has been virtually no application of this policy. There are a few prototype bilingual programs in existence in primary schools. There was also a new university established in 2010, La Universidad de las Américas (UDELAS), located in Chichica, which is dedicated to providing a degree in intercultural bilingual education. In 2012 UDELAS will have its first graduating class, and it is hoped that, according to Professor Julia Mora, it will produce a notable change in the Comarca Ngäbe-Buglé by training teachers who will rescue the Ngäbere language. There is another Comarca institution located in Soloy, La Universidad Ngäbe-Buglé, which is “preparando personal bilingüe de la comarca para la comarca” (preparing bilingual personnel from the Comarca for the Comarca). It is hoped that more Ngäbes will be trained as teachers who will show greater dedication to the preservation of Ngäbe culture and language by working within the Comarca.

== Research problems ==
Research of Ngäbere has been sporadic throughout the past 200 years. Among the first efforts to study the language was a basic lexicon written in the beginning of the 19th century by Padre Blas José Franco. His work was the base of a lexicon written by A. L. Pinart, who visited the Cricamola River region in 1893. His findings were then used as the base of some language studies by other linguists, but very little of the information was thoroughly reliable or extensive.

Ephraim S. Alphonse was a Methodist missionary who lived among the Ngäbe for 21 years and became fluent in their language. In 1956, his Guaymí Grammar and Dictionary was published. While far more substantial than anything previously published, it still had problems. José Murillo notes that, “Aunque los ejemplos de este autor son numerosos, carecen, en general, de transmorfologización, lo cual hace al trabajo poco útil.” (Although the examples of this author are numerous, they lack, in general, in transmorphologization, which makes them of little use to work with” Alphonse was not a trained linguist, so while his effort was well-intentioned and his long history with the people was insightful, it remained for the next generation of linguists to offer a more detailed and correct description of Ngäbere grammar.

During the 1970s and 80s, more attention was focused on studying the phonetic and grammatical structures, during which time a definite alphabet and writing system was developed. Kopesec offers a more comprehensive description of the grammar. Payne also gave insights on the function of the subject in Ngäbere. Murillo has recently expanded on the works of Kopesec and Payne in regards to the grammar and formation of words and sentences.) Lininger comments on the difficulties regarding the research itself due to the linguistic pre-perceptions of the researchers:

“Al trabajar con una lengua desconocida ha habido problemas para los investigadores por falta de pares mínimos y/o marcos adecuados. Al trabajar diferentes personas en análisis previos ha habido diferencias de punto de vista en cuanto a la interpretación de datos. Posiblemente por la naturaleza de sus diversos idiomas (inglés y español), al trabajar hablantes nativos de distintos idiomas ha habido diferencias de percepción que resultaron en sobrediferenciación de fonemas de parte de los investigadores”
(When working with an unknown language there have been problems for the investigators because of the lack of minimal pairs and/or adequate framework. Different people when working in previous analyses have had different points of view regarding the interpretation of data. Possibly due to the nature of their diverse languages (English and Spanish), native speakers of different languages have had differences of perception that resulted in overdifferentiation of phonemes on the part of the investigators.)

Spanish speakers find the Ngäbere nasalized vowels quite difficult to distinguish and reproduce due to the nature of Spanish vowels. It has also been observed by English speakers that “/b/, /m/, /n/, and /l/ are notoriously difficult to distinguish in Guaymí speech” (Young 1990). Oftentimes spelling has been inconsistent within the body of published research.

Studies in the past have sometimes been conducted in a manner which could lead to inconclusive results for the language as a whole (i.e., using only one informant as the language source in the study), as in the studies of Lininger and Payne in studying the Ngäbere of Costa Rican speakers.

As has been the case over the past 200 years, there is a scarcity of current published research, especially on cultural language use. There are some published colloquial works, educational manuals, and religious translations, although few in number. These include stories from the oral tradition; a translation of the New Testament, Kukwe Kuin Ngöbökwe and a hymnal, Ari Kare Ngöböye.

== See also ==
- Ngöbe–Buglé people
