= Buglere =

Chibchan language native to Panama

- Murire
- Pronunciation: [buˈɡleɾe]
- Native to: Panama
- Ethnicity: Bokota people
- Native speakers: 18,000 (2012)
- Language family: Chibchan: Isthmic; Guaymí–Guna; Guaymi; Buglere
- Dialects: Sabanero; Bokotá

Language codes
- ISO 639-3: sab
- Glottolog: bugl1243
- ELP: Bocotá
- Linguasphere: 81-ECA-b

Buglere (/bʊˈɡlɛreɪ/), also known as Bugle, Murire and Muoy, is a Chibchan language of Panama closely related to Guaymí. There are two dialects, Sabanero and Bokotá (Bogota), spoken by the Bokota people.

== Phonology ==
Consonants
		Labial	Dental/ Alveolar	Palatal	Velar	Glottal
Plosive/ Affricate	voiceless		t	tʃ	k	
Plosive/ Affricate	voiced	b	d	dʒ	ɡ	
Fricative			s			h
Nasal		m	n		ŋ	
Rhotic			ɾ			
Lateral			l			
Approximant		w		j		

- Voiced sounds /b, d, ɡ/ may be heard as fricatives [β, ð, ɣ] in intervocalic position.
- /dʒ/ may also be heard as [ʒ] in intervocalic position.
- /ŋ/ when before a vowel in word-initial position can also be heard as a palatal [ɲ].

Vowels
	Front	Central	Back
Close	i		u
Near-close	ɪ		ʊ
Mid	e		o
Open		a	

- Vowel sounds /e, o/ can also have short allophones of [ɛ, ɔ].
- Vowels can also be heard as nasalized when in the positions of nasal consonants.
