= Bokota people =

Indigenous people of Panama

Bokota
Total population
- 26,871

Regions with significant populations
- Panama (Bocas del Toro)

Languages
- Bogota language

Religion
- Traditional tribal religion

Related ethnic groups
- Ngöbe Buglé by marriage

The Bokota, also called Bogotá or Bugleres, are an Indigenous people of Panama. They live in Bocas del Toro and north of Veraguas. As the 2010 Census, there were 26,871 Bogota living in Panama. They are the smallest tribe in Panama and live in the west of the country. Traditionally they spoke the Bokota language, a dialect of Buglere.

== Culture ==
The Bokota dedicate themselves to livestock, fishing, and hunting. They still use weapons like bows and arrows and spears or fishnets. Men wear shirts of manta-sucia, while women dress similar to the Ngobes. They wear necklaces, facial paint of black and red, and shiny hair combs. They make hats of vegetable fibers, backpacks, baskets, and daily dresses called cobo. They live in round houses on stilts. They are monogamous, and the Bokotas have often intermarried with the Ngöbe Buglés, another Indigenous tribe of Panama. There are still fullblood families of Bokota. Many traditional ceremonies are maintained, including the ceremony of lightning, which prevents lightning from striking their houses.

== Language ==
They speak the Bokota language, also called Buglere, which is one of the Chibchan languages.

== See also ==
- Ngäbe–Buglé people
