= List of Panamanian flags =

This is a list of flags associated with Panama.

== National flags ==
Flag	Date	Use	Description
	1925–present	Flag of Panama	Rectangle divided into four quadrants, with the upper hoist consisting of a white background with a blue five-point star, the upper fly consisting of a red background, the lower hoist consisting of a blue background, and the lower fly consisting of a white background with a red five-point star.
	?–present	Presidential standard of Panama	Current flag of Panama with the Panamanian coat of arms in the middle.
	1903–1979	Flag of the Panama Canal Zone (U.S. territory)	A blue field with the territory's emblem in the center.
	1903	First flag of Panama	Divided rectangle into four quadrants, with the upper hoist consisting of a blue background, the upper fly consisting of a white background with a red five-point star, the lower hoist consisting of a white background with a blue five-point star, and the lower fly consisting of a red background.
	1903	Proposed flag of Panama	Thirteen horizontal red-yellow alternating stripes with a blue canton, featuring two suns connected together, representing North America and South America being united by the Panama isthmus.

== Province flags ==
Flag	Date	Use	Description
	?–present	Flag of Bocas del Toro Province	Flag divided diagonally in half from the upper hoist corner to the lower fly corner, green on bottom half and yellow on the top half. Three white five-pointed stars in a slight arc centered above a serifed capital 'B' with a drop shadow.
	2004–present	Flag of Coclé Province	Vertical tricolor with, from hoist to fly, red, gray, and white. The red stripe has two gray diamonds, one towards the bottom corner from the top one. The gray stripe has two white diamonds, one at the bottom and one at the top. The white stripe has two red diamonds, one towards the bottom corner from the top one.
	1996–present	Flag of Colón Province	Horizontal tricolor with, from top to bottom, baby blue, white, and gold. The coat of arms of Colón is centered in the middle, with five gold five-pointed stars in an arc at the top.
	?–present	Flag of Chiriquí Province	Flag divided diagonally in half from the lower hoist corner to the upper fly corner, red at the top and green at the bottom. There are fourteen white five-pointed stars in the middle arrayed in a circle, similar to the EU flag.
	?–present	Flag of Darién Province	Flag divided diagonally in half from the lower hoist corner to the upper fly corner, baby blue at the top and green at the bottom. There are four yellow five-pointed stars, arrayed in a hard curve.
	1992–present	Flag of Herrera Province	Flag divided in half horizontally, with gold on the top half and blue on the bottom half. There is a labeled map of the province in the middle, with seven blue five-pointed stars at the top arrayed in a curve to represent each district in the province.
	1850–present	Flag of Los Santos Province	Horizontal tricolor with, from the top to the bottom, blue, gold, and red.
	2015–present	Flag of Panamá Oeste Province	Horizontal triband with, from top to bottom, gold, white, and gold. At the hoist is a green pile with five white five-pointed stars arrayed in a curve.
	2019–present	Flag of Veraguas Province	Blue background with a white filled-in outline of the province. It also has twelve white five-pointed stars arrayed around the map.

== Indigenous regions ==
Flag	Date	Use	Description
	?–present	Flag of Emberá-Wounaan Comarca	Horizontal tricolor with a large green stripe at the top, and thinner stripes of yellow and blue below.
	2010–present	Flag of Guna Yala comarca	Horizontal tricolor with an enlarged middle yellow stripe, and a top red stripe and bottom green stripe. There are two crossed arms in the middle, one holding an arrow and the other a bow. There are eight five-point stars arrayed in a curve around the top of the middle symbol.
	1925–2010	Flag of revolution of Guna and former Guna Yala flag	Horizontal triband with an enlarged middle yellow stripe, with orange top and bottom stripes. In the middle rests a black left-facing swastika.
	1942	Former flag of Guna Yala	Horizontal triband with an enlarged middle yellow stripe, with red top and bottom stripes. In the middle rests a black left-facing swastika, with a red ring, representing the nose rings the Guna people use, encircling it, overlapping the swastika except the top branch; The design was created to distance the original flag away from the Nazis.
	2009–present	Flag of Ngäbe-Buglé Comarca	Vertical tricolor with, from hoist to fly, red, white, and green stripes. In the center, there are three five-point stars, with one stacked on the other two.
	?–present	Flag of Naso Tjër Di Comarca	The comarca's emblem centered in the middle of a plain white background.

== Historical flags ==
Flag	Date	Use	Description
	1698–1700	Colony of New Caledonia	Red background with three thin stripes at the bottom, from top to bottom, blue, white, and blue, representing a sea. Above the stripes there is a rising yellow sun shifted towards the hoist.
	1739–1810, 1816–1822	Flag of the Viceroyalty of New Granada	The flag for the viceroyalty was the Spanish flag from 1785 to 1873. It is a horizontal triband, with an enlarged yellow center stripe with two red stripes at the top and bottom. Off-centered towards the hoist is an outdated version of the coat of arms of Spain.
	1821–1831	Flag of Gran Colombia	A horizontal tricolor with, from top to bottom, yellow, blue, and red. The center contains the coat of arms of Gran Colombia.
	1831–1863	Flag of the Republic of New Granada and the Granadine Confederation.	A vertical tricolor with, from hoist to fly, red, blue, and yellow.
	1863–1886	Flag of the United States of Colombia	A horizontal tricolor with an enlarged yellow top stripe with a blue and a red stripe below.
	1886–1903	Flag of the Republic of Colombia	A horizontal tricolor with an enlarged yellow top stripe with a blue and a red stripe below.
	1824–1855	Flag of the Isthmus Department	A horizontal tricolor with an enlarged yellow top stripe with a blue and a red stripe below. In the upper hoist is the coat of arms of Gran Colombia.
	1855–1863	Flag of the State of Panama	A vertical tricolor of red, blue, and yellow with the state's emblem in the center.
	1863–1886	Flag of the State of Panama	A horizontal tricolor with an enlarged yellow top stripe, a blue and a red stripe below, and the state's emblem in the center.
