= Panama at the 2025 World Aquatics Championships =

- Flag of Panama
- World Aquatics code: PAN
- National federation: Panama Swimming Federation
- Website: fpnatacion.org (in Spanish)

in Singapore
- Competitors: 4 in 1 sport
- Medals: Gold 0 Silver 0 Bronze 0 Total 0

World Aquatics Championships appearances
- 1973; 1975; 1978; 1982; 1986; 1991; 1994; 1998; 2001; 2003; 2005; 2007; 2009; 2011; 2013; 2015; 2017; 2019; 2022; 2023; 2024; 2025

Panama competed at the 2025 World Aquatics Championships in Singapore from July 11 to August 3, 2025.

== Competitors ==
The following is the list of competitors in the Championships.

Sport	Men	Women	Total
Swimming	2	2	4
Total	2	2	4

== Swimming ==
Panama entered 4 swimmers.

Men

Athlete	Event	Heat		Semi-final		Final	
Athlete	Event	Time	Rank	Time	Rank	Time	Rank
Julio Rodríguez	50 m freestyle	23.48	61	Did not advance			
Julio Rodríguez	50 m butterfly	25.08	56	Did not advance			
Andrey Villarreal	100 m freestyle	52.39	68	Did not advance			
Andrey Villarreal	200 m freestyle	1:57.94	51	Did not advance			

Women

Athlete	Event	Heat		Semi-final		Final	
Athlete	Event	Time	Rank	Time	Rank	Time	Rank
Carolina Cermelli	100 m backstroke	1:06.25	45	Did not advance			
Carolina Cermelli	200 m backstroke	2:23.30	39	Did not advance			
Emily Santos	100 m breaststroke	1:09.62	37	Did not advance			
Emily Santos	200 m breaststroke	2:30.95	27	Did not advance			
