= Panama at the 2017 World Aquatics Championships =

- Flag of Panama
- World Aquatics code: PAN
- National federation: Federación Panameña de Natación
- Website: www.fpnatacion.org

in Budapest, Hungary
- Competitors: 6 in 2 sports
- Medals: Gold 0 Silver 0 Bronze 0 Total 0

World Aquatics Championships appearances
- 1973; 1975; 1978; 1982; 1986; 1991; 1994; 1998; 2001; 2003; 2005; 2007; 2009; 2011; 2013; 2015; 2017; 2019; 2022; 2023; 2024; 2025

Panama is scheduled to compete at the 2017 World Aquatics Championships in Budapest, Hungary from 14 July to 30 July.

== Swimming ==
Panama has received a Universality invitation from FINA to send three swimmers (one man and two women) to the World Championships.

Athlete	Event	Heat		Semifinal		Final	
Athlete	Event	Time	Rank	Time	Rank	Time	Rank
Édgar Crespo	Men's 50 m breaststroke	27.93	32	did not advance			
Édgar Crespo	Men's 100 m breaststroke	1:01.74	32	did not advance			
Carolina Cermelli	Women's 50 m backstroke	30.77	49	did not advance			
Carolina Cermelli	Women's 100 m backstroke	1:05.50	44	did not advance			
Catharine Cooper	Women's 50 m freestyle	26.99	47	did not advance			
Catharine Cooper	Women's 100 m freestyle	59.37	54	did not advance			

== Synchronized swimming ==
Panama's synchronized swimming team consisted of 3 athletes (1 male and 2 female).

Mixed

Athlete	Event	Preliminaries		Final	
Athlete	Event	Points	Rank	Points	Rank
Gabriela Bello Acosta; Alberto Pinto; Maria Urrutia (R)	Duet technical routine	59.5706	10 Q	59.8113	10
Gabriela Bello Acosta; Alberto Pinto; Maria Urrutia (R)	Duet free routine	60.2000	11 Q	60.7667	11

Legend: (R) = Reserve Athlete
