= Panama at the 2023 World Aquatics Championships =

- Flag of Panama
- World Aquatics code: PAN
- National federation: Panama Swimming Federation
- Website: fpnatacion.org (in Spanish)

in Fukuoka, Japan
- Competitors: 4 in 1 sport
- Medals: Gold 0 Silver 0 Bronze 0 Total 0

World Aquatics Championships appearances
- 1973; 1975; 1978; 1982; 1986; 1991; 1994; 1998; 2001; 2003; 2005; 2007; 2009; 2011; 2013; 2015; 2017; 2019; 2022; 2023; 2024; 2025

Panama is set to compete at the 2023 World Aquatics Championships in Fukuoka, Japan from 14 to 30 July.

== Swimming ==
Panama entered 4 swimmers.

Men

| Athlete | Event | Heat | | Semifinal | | Final | |
| Athlete | Event | Time | Rank | Time | Rank | Time | Rank |
|---|---|---|---|---|---|---|---|
| Jeancarlo Calderon Harper | 100 metre freestyle | 51.42 | 64 | Did not advance | | | |
| Jeancarlo Calderon Harper | 100 metre butterfly | 55.63 | 55 | Did not advance | | | |
| Tyler Christianson | 200 metre breaststroke | 2:17.43 | 33 | Did not advance | | | |
| Tyler Christianson | 200 metre individual medley | 2:04.71 | 33 | Did not advance | | | |

Women

| Athlete | Event | Heat | | Semifinal | | Final | |
| Athlete | Event | Time | Rank | Time | Rank | Time | Rank |
|---|---|---|---|---|---|---|---|
| Carolina Cermelli | 100 metre backstroke | 1:04.85 | 46 | Did not advance | | | |
| Carolina Cermelli | 200 metre backstroke | 2:18.50 NR | 29 | Did not advance | | | |
| Emily Santos | 50 metre breaststroke | 32.23 NR | 35 | Did not advance | | | |
| Emily Santos | 100 metre breaststroke | 1:10.57 | 39 | Did not advance | | | |

Mixed

| Athlete | Event | Heat | | Final | |
| Athlete | Event | Time | Rank | Time | Rank |
|---|---|---|---|---|---|
| Jeancarlo Calderon Harper; Emily Santos; Carolina Cermelli; Tyler Christianson | 4 × 100 m freestyle relay | 3:53.19 | 33 | Did not advance | |
| Carolina Cermelli; Emily Santos; Jeancarlo Calderon Harper; Tyler Christianson | 4 × 100 m medley relay | 4:07.08 | 27 | Did not advance | |
