= Panama at the 2024 World Aquatics Championships =

- Flag of Panama
- World Aquatics code: PAN
- National federation: Panama Swimming Federation
- Website: fpnatacion.org (in Spanish)

in Doha, Qatar
- Competitors: 4 in 1 sport
- Medals: Gold 0 Silver 0 Bronze 0 Total 0

World Aquatics Championships appearances
- 1973; 1975; 1978; 1982; 1986; 1991; 1994; 1998; 2001; 2003; 2005; 2007; 2009; 2011; 2013; 2015; 2017; 2019; 2022; 2023; 2024; 2025

Panama competed at the 2024 World Aquatics Championships in Doha, Qatar from 2 to 18 February.

== Competitors ==
The following is the list of competitors in the Championships.

Sport	Men	Women	Total
Swimming	2	2	4
Total	2	2	4

== Swimming ==
Panama entered 4 swimmers.

Men

Athlete	Event	Heat		Semifinal		Final	
Athlete	Event	Time	Rank	Time	Rank	Time	Rank
Isaac Beitia	100 metre freestyle	51.40	46	Did not advance			
Isaac Beitia	200 metre freestyle	1:56.31	56	Did not advance			
Jeancarlo Calderon	50 metre freestyle	23.52	52	Did not advance			
Jeancarlo Calderon	50 metre butterfly	24.95	41	Did not advance			

Women

Athlete	Event	Heat		Semifinal		Final	
Athlete	Event	Time	Rank	Time	Rank	Time	Rank
Carolina Cermelli	100 metre backstroke	1:04.83	37	Did not advance			
Carolina Cermelli	200 metre backstroke	2:20.33	27	Did not advance			
Emily Santos	100 metre breaststroke	1:09.96	29	Did not advance			
Emily Santos	200 metre breaststroke	2:31.36	20	Did not advance			
