= Scouting and Guiding in Panama =

Scouting and Guiding movement in Panama

Scouting and Guiding has been popular in Panama since the 1920s. Today, it is still a tradition practiced around the country. As of 2010, Panama has 1,775 Scouts.

== Current associations ==
The Scout and Guide movement in Panama is served by

- Asociación de Muchachas Guías de Panamá, member of the World Association of Girl Guides and Girl Scouts
- Asociación Nacional de Scouts de Panamá, member of the World Organization of the Scout Movement

== History ==
The first girl scout group ever founded in Panama was Asociación Nacional de Scouts de Panamá, which was founded in 1924.

Scouting in Panama became popular by the 1940s. By March 1942, there were already 542 new scouts.

One of the first scouts in Panama was the Girl Scouts of the Canal Zone. Lillian Mountford led the group until her retirement in 1945. During her later life, she became an advocate for the World Association of Girl Guides and Girl Scouts and the Juliette Low World Friendship Fund. After she died, Mountford Lodge was named as a tribute to her.

In 1950, Asociación de Muchachas Guías de Panamá was founded.

In 1959, the Lady Baden Powell Award (named after Olave Baden-Powell) was first introduced in Panama.

From the 1980s to 2000s, girl scout groups operated near multiple U.S. military bases.

== International Scouting units in Panama ==
In addition, there are American Boy Scouts in Panama, originally linked to the Canal Zone Council of the Boy Scouts of America, now part of Direct Service, which supports units around the world, through at least 1987. Also, in the 1950s and 1960s were the 900 member International Boy Scouts of the Canal Zone, directly registered to the World Bureau.

== Legacy ==
In 2020, the Panama National Assembly granted a Scroll of Recognition to the National Association of Scouts of Panama.
