= Guna language =

Chibchan language spoken in Panama and Colombia

Guna
- Kuna
- Dulegaya
- Native to: Panama, Colombia
- Region: San Blas Islands, Panama; north coastal region, Colombia
- Ethnicity: Guna people
- Native speakers: (61,000 cited 2000)
- Language family: Chibchan: Isthmic; Guaymí–Guna; Guna

Language codes
- ISO 639-3: Either: cuk – San Blas Kuna kvn – Border Kuna
- Glottolog: kuna1280
- ELP: Kuna
- Linguasphere: 81-EGA-a
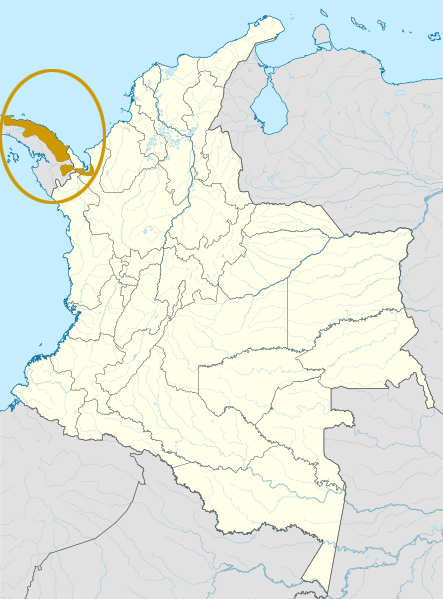

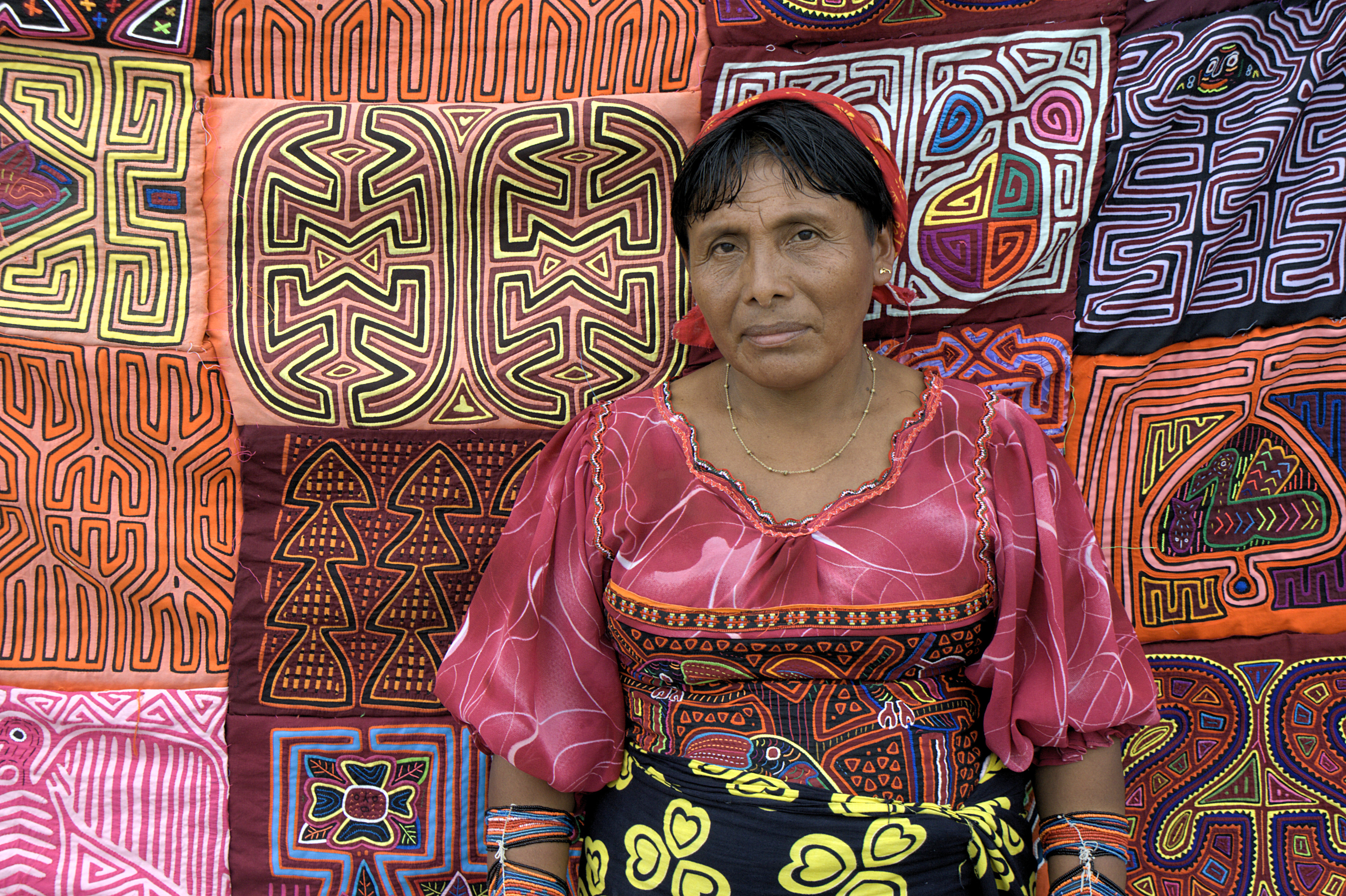
Guna woman selling Molas

The Guna language (formerly Kuna or Cuna), spoken by the Guna people of Panama and Colombia, belongs to the Chibchan language family.

== History ==
The Guna were living in what is now Northern Colombia and the Darién Province of Panama at the time of the Spanish invasion, and only later began to move westward towards what is now Guna Yala due to a conflict with Spanish and other Indigenous groups. Centuries before the conquest, the Guna arrived in South America as part of a Chibchan migration moving east from Central America. At the time of the Spanish invasion, they were living in the region of Uraba and near the borders of what are now Antioquia and Caldas. Alonso de Ojeda and Vasco Núñez de Balboa explored the coast of Colombia in 1500 and 1501. They spent the most time in the Gulf of Urabá, where they made contact with the Guna.

In far-eastern Guna Yala, the community of New Caledonia is near the site where Scottish explorers tried, unsuccessfully, to establish a colony in the "New World". The bankruptcy of the expedition has been cited as one of the motivations of the 1707 Acts of Union.

There is a wide consensus regarding the migrations of Guna from Colombia and the Darien towards what is now Guna Yala. These migrations were caused partly by wars with the Catio people, but some sources contend that they were mostly due to bad treatment by the Spanish invaders. The Guna themselves attribute their migration to Guna Yala to conflicts with the native peoples, and their migration to the islands to the excessive mosquito populations on the mainland.

During the first decades of the twentieth century, the Panamanian government attempted to suppress many of the traditional customs. This was bitterly resisted, culminating in a short-lived yet successful revolt in 1925 known as the Tule Revolution (or people revolution), led by Iguaibilikinyah Nele Gantule of Ustupu and supported by American adventurer and part-time diplomat Richard Marsh – and a treaty in which the Panamanians agreed to give the Guna some degree of cultural autonomy.

== Phonemes ==
The Guna language recognizes 5 vowel phonemes and 17 consonantal phonemes.

=== Vowels ===
	Front	Central	Back
High	i		u
Mid	e		o
Low		a	

Vowels may be short or long.

=== Consonants ===
		Labial	Alveolar	Palatal	Velar
Plosive	Lax	p ⟨b⟩	t ⟨d⟩		k ⟨g⟩
Plosive	Tense	pː ⟨bb⟩	tː ⟨dd⟩		kː ⟨gg⟩
Nasal	Lax	m ⟨m⟩	n ⟨n⟩		
Nasal	Tense	mː ⟨mm⟩	nː ⟨nn⟩		
Affricate				tʃ ⟨ds, ss⟩	
Fricative			s ⟨s⟩		
Lateral	Lax		l ⟨l⟩		
Lateral	Tense		lˑ ⟨ll⟩		
Rhotic			ɾ ⟨r⟩		
Approximants		w ⟨w⟩		j ⟨y⟩	

Most consonants may appear either as short (lax) or long (tense). The long consonants only appear in intervocalic position. However, they are not always a result of morpheme concatenation, and they often differ phonetically from the short analogue. For example, the long stop consonants p, t, and k are pronounced as voiceless, usually with longer duration than in English. The short counterparts are pronounced as voiced b, d, and g when they are between vowels or beside sonorant consonants m, n, l, r, y, or w (they are written using b, d, and g in the Guna alphabet). At the beginnings of words, the stops may be pronounced either as voiced or voiceless; and are usually pronounced as voiceless word-finally (Long consonants do not appear word-initially or word-finally). In an even more extreme case, the long s is pronounced [tʃ]. Underlying long consonants become short before another consonant. The letter w may be pronounced as either [v] or [w] depending on dialect and position.

=== Other phonological rules ===
The alveolar /s/ becomes the postalveolar [ʃ] after /n/ or /t/. Both long and short /k/ become [j] before another consonant.

== Orthography ==
In 2010, the Guna General Congress decided a spelling reform by which long consonants should be written with double letters. Equally, the phonemes /p, t, k/ that may sound like [p, t, k] or [b, d, g] are represented by ⟨b, d, g⟩ in all positions. Equally, the old digraph ⟨ch⟩ becomes ⟨ss⟩ or ⟨ds⟩ depending on its morphological precedence (narassole [naraʧole] < naras + sole, godsa [koʧa] 'called' < godde 'to call' + -sa (past). So, the reformed orthography uses only the fifteen letters ⟨b, d, g, l, m, n, r, s, w, y; a, e, i, o, u⟩ for transcribing all the sounds of the language, with the digraphs ⟨bb, dd, gg, ll, mm, nn, ss⟩ for the tense consonants.

== Morphology ==
Guna is an agglutinative language which contains words of up to about 9 morphemes, although words of two or three morphemes are more common. Most of the morphological complexity is found in the verb, which contains suffixes of tense and aspect, plurals, negatives, position (sitting, standing, etc.) and various adverbials. The verb is not marked for person.
