= Panama Department =

Panama Department may refer to:

- Isthmus Department, of Gran Columbia (1824–1831)
- Panama Department, of the State of Panama
- Panama Department (1886) of modern Colombia (1886-1903)
