= Panama at the 2015 World Aquatics Championships =

- Flag of Panama
- World Aquatics code: PAN
- National federation: Federación Panameña de Natación
- Website: www.fpnatacion.org

in Kazan, Russia
- Competitors: 3 in 1 sport
- Medals: Gold 0 Silver 0 Bronze 0 Total 0

World Aquatics Championships appearances
- 1973; 1975; 1978; 1982; 1986; 1991; 1994; 1998; 2001; 2003; 2005; 2007; 2009; 2011; 2013; 2015; 2017; 2019; 2022; 2023; 2024; 2025

Panama competed at the 2015 World Aquatics Championships in Kazan, Russia from 24 July to 9 August 2015.

== Swimming ==
Panamanian swimmers have achieved qualifying standards in the following events (up to a maximum of 2 swimmers in each event at the A-standard entry time, and 1 at the B-standard):

Men

Athlete	Event	Heat		Semifinal		Final	
Athlete	Event	Time	Rank	Time	Rank	Time	Rank
Édgar Crespo	50 m breaststroke	28.29	34	did not advance			
Édgar Crespo	100 m breaststroke	1:02.37	40	did not advance			
Franco Reyes	50 m butterfly	24.60	39	did not advance			
Franco Reyes	100 m butterfly	54.49	46	did not advance			

Women

Athlete	Event	Heat		Semifinal		Final	
Athlete	Event	Time	Rank	Time	Rank	Time	Rank
Maria Far Nuñez	200 m butterfly	2:19.65	36	did not advance			
Maria Far Nuñez	400 m individual medley	5:05.55	33	—		did not advance	
