= Panama at the 2022 World Aquatics Championships =

- Flag of Panama
- World Aquatics code: PAN
- National federation: Panama Swimming Federation

in Budapest, Hungary
- Competitors: 4 in 1 sport
- Medals: Gold 0 Silver 0 Bronze 0 Total 0

World Aquatics Championships appearances
- 1973; 1975; 1978; 1982; 1986; 1991; 1994; 1998; 2001; 2003; 2005; 2007; 2009; 2011; 2013; 2015; 2017; 2019; 2022; 2023; 2024; 2025

Panama competed at the 2022 World Aquatics Championships in Budapest, Hungary from 17 June to 3 July.

== Swimming ==
Panama entered four swimmers.

Men

Athlete	Event	Heat		Semifinal		Final	
Athlete	Event	Time	Rank	Time	Rank	Time	Rank
Tyler Christianson	200 m breaststroke	2:18.77	31	did not advance			
Tyler Christianson	200 m medley	2:06.47	34	did not advance			
Édgar Crespo	50 m breaststroke	28.59	33	did not advance			
Édgar Crespo	100 m breaststroke	1:05.09	49	did not advance			

Women

Athlete	Event	Heat		Semifinal		Final	
Athlete	Event	Time	Rank	Time	Rank	Time	Rank
Carolina Cermelli	100 m backstroke	1:05.16	34	did not advance			
Carolina Cermelli	200 m backstroke	2:20.93	19	did not advance			
Emily Santos	100 m breaststroke	1:12.11	38	did not advance			
Emily Santos	200 m breaststroke	2:38.72	26	did not advance			
