= Panama at the 2019 World Aquatics Championships =

- Flag of Panama
- FINA code: PAN
- National federation: Panama Swimming Federation

in Gwangju, South Korea
- Competitors: 4 in 1 sport
- Medals: Gold 0 Silver 0 Bronze 0 Total 0

World Aquatics Championships appearances
- 1973; 1975; 1978; 1982; 1986; 1991; 1994; 1998; 2001; 2003; 2005; 2007; 2009; 2011; 2013; 2015; 2017; 2019; 2022; 2023; 2024

Panama competed at the 2019 World Aquatics Championships in Gwangju, South Korea from 12 to 28 July.

== Swimming ==
Panama entered four swimmers.

Men

Athlete	Event	Heat		Semifinal		Final	
Athlete	Event	Time	Rank	Time	Rank	Time	Rank
Isaac Beitia	50 m freestyle	23.45	63	Did not advance			
Isaac Beitia	100 m freestyle	50.66	58	Did not advance			
Édgar Crespo	50 m breaststroke	27.76	27	Did not advance			
Édgar Crespo	100 m breaststroke	1:02.62	48	Did not advance			

Women

Athlete	Event	Heat		Semifinal		Final	
Athlete	Event	Time	Rank	Time	Rank	Time	Rank
Catharine Cooper	50 m freestyle	26.88	47	Did not advance			
Catharine Cooper	100 m freestyle	1:00.08	64	Did not advance			
Nimia Murua	50 m backstroke	30.77	32	Did not advance			

Mixed

Athlete	Event	Heat		Final	
Athlete	Event	Time	Rank	Time	Rank
	4 × 100 m mixed freestyle relay	DNS		Did not advance	
	4 × 100 m mixed medley relay	DNS		Did not advance	
