= Mariano Arosemena =

Colombian writer (1794–1868)

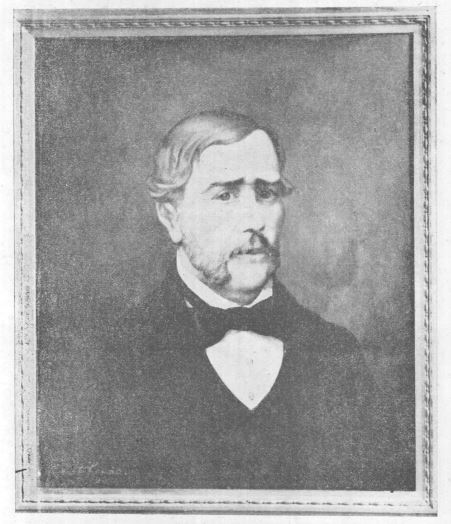
Portrait by Roberto Lewis.

Mariano Arosemena de la Barrera (Panama; July 26, 1794 — Lima; May 31, 1868) was neoclassical writer, journalist and politician who lived in the Isthmus of Panama when it was part of Gran Colombia. Arosemena married Dolores de Quesada y Velarde with whom he had his son, Justo Arosemena, a politician and writer considered the "father of Panamanian nationality."

== Biography ==
He was the son of Pablo Arosemena and Martina de la Barrera. As a politician he was councilor, mayor and deputy of the Isthmus in the colonial era; he promoted the first printing press in the isthmus and founded La Miscelánea del Istmo in 1820, the first newspaper in Panama. In said newspaper he advocated for the independence of Panama, which ultimately took place on November 28, 1821, with him being one of the main figures of this event.

After independence, when Panama voluntarily joined Gran Colombia, he was consul of Panama in Ecuador and of Colombia in Peru; He was a delegate to the American Congress of Lima, agent of the Public Credit of Panama, attorney general of Panama State (1862–1863). He also represented Panama before several congresses of New Granada. Before his death he was a correspondent for the Peruvian newspaper El Mercurio.

As a writer he had his crowning work with Apuntamientos históricos.
