= Colón Department =

Colón Department may refer to:

- Colón Department (Honduras)
- Colón Department, Entre Ríos, Argentina
- Colón Department, Córdoba, Argentina
- Colón Department (Colombia)

== See also ==
- Colón (disambiguation)
- Department (administrative division)
