= Panama at the 2013 World Aquatics Championships =

- Flag of Panama
- FINA code: PAN
- National federation: Federación Panameña de Natación
- Website: www.fpnatacion.org

in Barcelona, Spain
- Competitors: 3 in 1 sports
- Medals: Gold 0 Silver 0 Bronze 0 Total 0

World Aquatics Championships appearances
- 1973; 1975; 1978; 1982; 1986; 1991; 1994; 1998; 2001; 2003; 2005; 2007; 2009; 2011; 2013; 2015; 2017; 2019; 2022; 2023; 2024

Panama is competing at the 2013 World Aquatics Championships in Barcelona, Spain between 19 July and 4 August 2013.

== Swimming ==
Panamanian swimmers achieved qualifying standards in the following events (up to a maximum of 2 swimmers in each event at the A-standard entry time, and 1 at the B-standard):

Men

Athlete	Event	Heat		Semifinal		Final	
Athlete	Event	Time	Rank	Time	Rank	Time	Rank
Édgar Crespo	50 m breaststroke	27.89	28	did not advance			
Édgar Crespo	100 m breaststroke	1:01.95	37	did not advance			
Ricardo Yee	50 m butterfly	24.89	43	did not advance			
Ricardo Yee	100 m butterfly	55.82	39	did not advance			

Women

Athlete	Event	Heat		Semifinal		Final	
Athlete	Event	Time	Rank	Time	Rank	Time	Rank
Maria Far Nuñez	200 m butterfly	2:22.37	24	did not advance			
Maria Far Nuñez	400 m individual medley	5:14.48	30	—		did not advance	
