= Asociación Nacional de Scouts de Panamá =

Scouting organization in Panama

- Country: Panama
- Membership: 1,775
- Affiliation: World Organization of the Scout Movement
- Website www.scoutspanama.com

The Asociación Nacional de Scouts de Panamá is a Panamanian youth scouting organization founded in 1924 and accepted into the World Organization of the Scout Movement (WOSM) that same year. Although WOSM recognition was withdrawn in 1936, Panama regained membership in 1950. Panamanian Scouting is coeducational. In 2010, the organization had 1,775 Scouts.

Scouts are involved in community service projects such as disaster relief, conservation of natural resources, and collection of toys and games for impoverished children.

== Scouting ==
Scout Urracá badge

=== Programs ===
- Cubs-ages 6 to 10
- Scouts-ages 11 to 14
- Caminantes (walks)-15 to 17
- Rovers -18 to 20

The Scout Balboa is the principal award in the organization, replacing the former Scout Urraca, named after a local indigenous leader who fought Spanish conquistadores.

The membership badge of the Asociación Nacional de Scouts de Panamá incorporates elements of the flag of Panama, superimposed with a bust of the Spanish explorer/conquistador Vasco Núñez de Balboa.

=== Motto ===
Siempre listo, Always ready.

=== Oath ===
Prometo hacer cuanto de mi dependa para: Amar a Dios, Servir a mi Pais, Trabajar por la Paz y vivir la Ley Scout

I promise to do as much as I can to: Love God, Serve my Country, Work for Peace and live the Scout Law

=== Law ===
- El Scout cifra su honor en ser digno de confianza
- El Scout es leal para con Dios su patria, sus padres, jefes y subordinados
- El Scout es útil y ayuda a los demás sin pensar en recompensa
- El Scout es amigo de todos y hermano de todo Scout sin distinción de credo, raza, nacionalidad o clase social
- El Scout es cortés y caballeroso
- El Scout ve en la naturaleza la obra de Dios, proteje a los animales y plantas
- El Scout obedece sin replicar y hace las cosas en orden y completas
- El Scout sonríe y canta en sus dificultades
- El Scout es económico, trabajador y cuidadoso del bien ajeno
- El Scout es limpio y sano, puro en sus pensamientos, palabras y acciones
- The Scout figures his honor in being trustworthy
- The Scout is loyal to God his country, his parents, bosses and subordinates
- The Scout is helpful and assists others without expectation of reward.
- The Scout is friends of all and brother of all Scout without distinction of creed, race, nationality or social class
- The Scout is courteous and chivalrous
- The Scout sees the work of God in nature, protects the animals and plants
- The Scout obeys without replying and makes things in order and complete
- The Scout smiles and sings in his difficulties
- The Scout is economic, hard-working and careful of the good of others
- The Scout is clean and healthy, pure in his thoughts, words and actions

== See also ==
- Asociación de Muchachas Guías de Panamá
