= Richard Oglesby Marsh =

American engineer, explorer, diplomat & ethnologist (1883-1953)

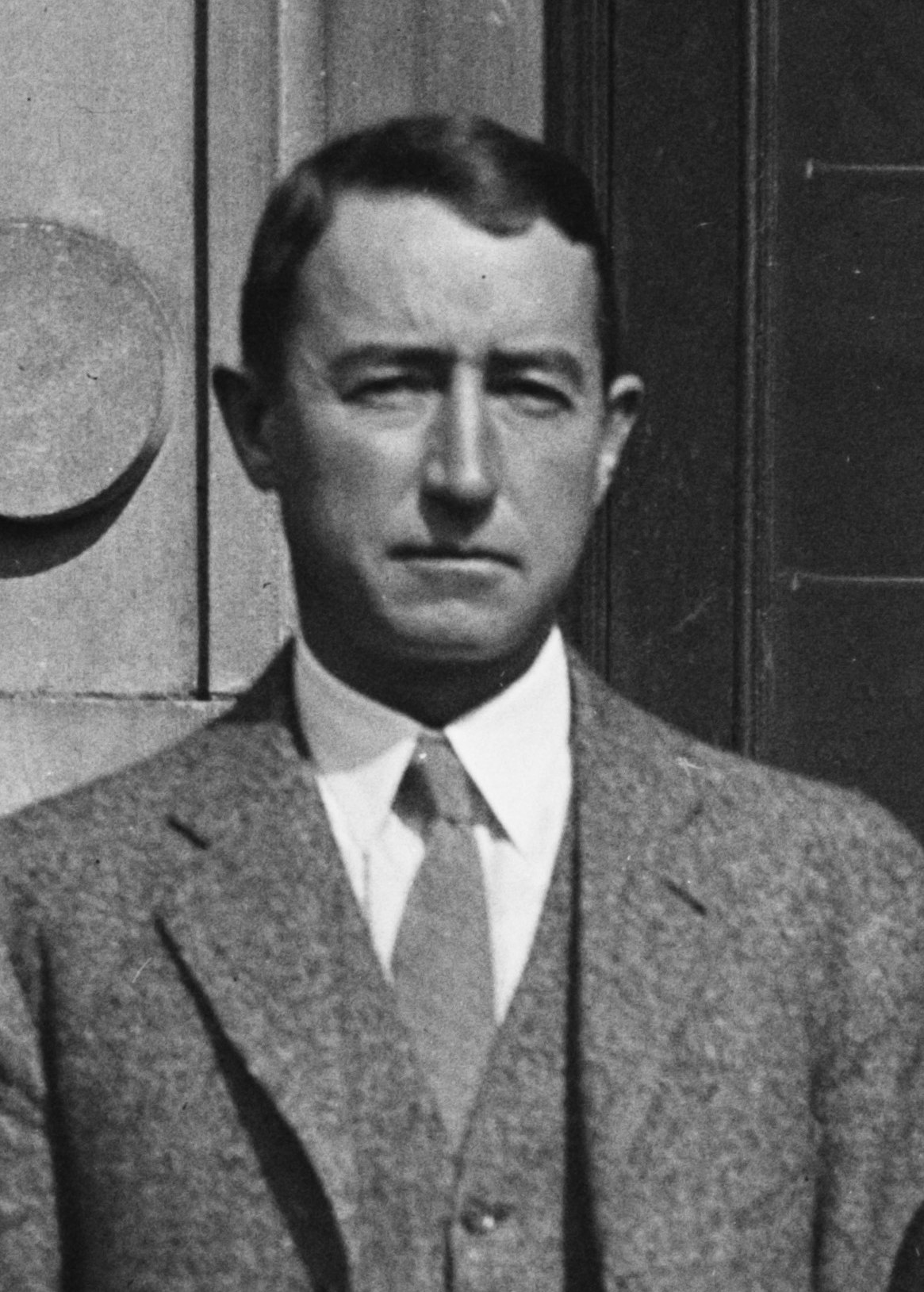
R. O. Marsh, 1924

Richard Oglesby Marsh (1883–1953) was an American engineer, explorer, diplomat, and ethnologist. He participated in engineering and ethnological expeditions to Panama and he is known for his participation in the Guna Revolution in 1925 on the side of the Kuna indigenas.

== Life ==
=== Rubber expeditions ===
In the early 1920s, Richard Marsh was sent by Henry Ford and Harvey Firestone to look for suitable rubber lands. He unsuccessfully explored the region between the Canal and Costa Rica as the land was irregular for large-scale rubber growing. In consequence, he explored the Darien region that remained unexplored in that years. Marsh sought some "white-Indians" in the region and come back to the United States to organize a scientific expedition in the Darien.

=== The Marsh Darien Expedition ===
Richard Marsh tried to convince Ford and Firestone of financing a wide exploration in Darien, not just for rubber lands. However, they weren't interested in ethnological research. Marsh lost interest in rubber and refused to go to the Philippines or Liberia.

Marsh got funds from an industrialist that was his friend for a new venture in Darien. A team of scientists was designated by the University of Rochester, the American Museum of Natural History of New York, and the Smithsonian Institution of Washington, D. C. joined the expedition. Marsh also counted with the support of Panamanian President Belisario Porras and the Canal Zone administration. The expedition lasted between 1924-1925 and was called the Marsh Darien Expedition.

=== Guna Yala Revolution ===
During this trip he stumbled upon the Kuna and quickly found them to be likeable people. He also began to learn of the cultural attacks that were being implemented by the Panamanian government in this area and on the Kuna people. In order to raise awareness to this issue, he brought a legion of Kuna across to North America, which gained the attention of both Canada and the United States. Marsh soon returned to Panama and became a spokesman for the Kuna people despite his original intentions of his journey being in search of wealth.

Marsh helped Kuna rebel leaders organize the rebellion in 1925 which attacked the Panamanian government. He also assisted in writing their declaration of independence which declared a new Kuna Republic.
