= San Blas Rebellion =

1925 indigenous revolt in Panama

Date	12 February 1925 – 4 May 1925
Location	San Blas Islands
Result	Hostilities cease by 27 February; US-mediated peace treaty in 4 May: Guna people give up independence aims and are integrated into Panama; Panama grants the Guna people's autonomy and ends forced assimilation.

Belligerents
Republic of Tule	Panama

Commanders and leaders
Richard Marsh; Nele Kantule; Simral Colman	Rodolfo Chiari

Strength
Unknown	Unknown

Casualties and losses
Unknown	27 policemen

The San Blas Rebellion was an uprising by the Guna, (Note: Formerly spelled Kuna or Cuna.) to declare independence, in the San Blas Islands, in February 1925.

The San Blas Islands, also known as the Guna Yala region, experienced an era of great political unrest during the early twentieth century, following the declaration of Independence by the Panamanian government in 1903. The Guna Yala region is situated between Colombia and Panama, and traditionally the Guna were able to cooperate with Colombia and live peacefully by their own laws and customs. Following Panama's declaration of independence, the new government attempted to control the Guna Yala region and its people, and impose a Westernised and "national" culture in its place.

The laws introduced by the Panamanian government significantly influenced traditional Guna customs and culture. The San Blas Rebellion consisted of multiple attempts made by the Guna to resist this control, and fight back against Panamanian authorities. Resistance against this power resulted in the Revolution of 1925, which resulted in 27 deaths, and initiated the peace agreement involving the United States that followed.

This rebellion is also known as the Tule Revolution, or the Guna Revolution, and was a direct consequence of repression by the Panamanian government. The Guna felt this was crucial for their ethnic survival as the laws implemented by the new Panamanian government directly impacted traditional Guna education, dress and customs.

The Revolution was planned by Guna leaders, and the Guna received US backing for an autonomous region during the mediation process. Through those negotiations, peace was once again achieved. The Guna were made to withdraw their declaration of independence and abide by the laws of the Panamanian government, so long as their terms were agreed upon and the Panamanian authorities did not threaten to eradicate Guna traditions and customs.

== Background ==
=== Panama's independence ===
In 1903, Panama issued a declaration of independence from Colombia, with support from the U.S. government. At the time of their declaration of independence, the San Blas islands were situated in a strategic location on the Colombian border, and some villages remained loyal to Colombia. However, Panama's unity as nationality was in doubt, and Gunas claimed themselves as a distinctly non-Latin culture, demanding ethnic autonomy.

=== Panamanian intervention in San Blas ===
Realizing the significance of this region, the Panamanian government began to incorporate it into the new nation by establishing administrative control of the area and followed an assimilation program since 1904, when some villages of San Blas accepted the flag of Panama. In 1906, Panamanian government took 17 Guna students to be educated in the Western way, and in 1907 a priests entered San Blas with armed supporters. In 1909, a police border was introduced, leading to several conflicts between police officers and the Guna.

The Guna resisted the assimilation program. In 1910, President Carlos Mendoza was rejected in San Blas as President Porras five years later.

=== Forced assimilation ===
In 1919, Panamanian President Belisario Porras began a policy of forced assimilation. The government introduced bans which affected the wearing of some components of traditional woman's dress. The government introduced these laws to Westernize Guna society and assert control. They stopped Guna women from wearing their mola blouses, nose rings and leg and arm bindings, and forced them to wear Western style clothing.

There was a strong link between traditional dress and Guna culture and identity, which made it a subject for control and change by the Panamanian government. As a fairly conservative society, the men typically wore dress shirts and trousers and the women wore traditional colourful dresses called tulemolas which were handmade. They also wore multicoloured bracelets known as winnis, which were beaded and believed to keep unwanted evil spirits away.

The Guna greatly objected to the control on their cultural dress, and ethnic identity, and showed great strength in their reaction to the bans implemented by the government. For example, in 1925 for a three-year period following the revolution, women were required to once again adopt traditional dress as a form of rebellion against the government. Women on Nargana and other more progressive islands were forced to wear mola, even if they had never worn this traditional dress, and their noses had to be pierced by force.

== Revolution ==
=== Forces ===
==== Richard Marsh ====
In 1925, the Kuna leaders planned and arranged a major revolt. The leaders were advised and supported by Richard Marsh. Marsh later wrote their declaration of independence.

Marsh was an American explorer who had initially gone to the Kuna Yala region in the search of "White Indians", the lost ancestors of European heritage. During this trip he stumbled upon the Kuna and quickly found them to be likeable people. He also began to learn of the cultural attacks that were being implemented by the Panamanian government in this area and on the Kuna people. In order to raise awareness to this issue, he brought a legion of Kuna across to North America, which gained the attention of both Canada and the United States.

Marsh soon returned to Panama and became a spokesman for the Kuna people despite his original intentions of his journey being in search of wealth.

Marsh helped Kuna rebel leaders organise the rebellion in 1925 which attacked the Panamanian government. He also assisted in writing their declaration of independence which declared a new Kuna Republic.

==== Guna Rebel Leaders ====
The main leaders involved in the revolt was the Chief of the island of Ustupu, Nele Kantule, and the Chief of the island of Ailigandi, Simral Colman.

The motivation for the attacks were to revolt against the Panamanian police and government. They planned to do this by attacking the islands that were being most controlled by Panamanian officials.

The Flag of the Revolution Guna, adopted in 1925

=== About the Revolution ===
On 12 February 1925, a conference was held in Aligandi, which lasted twenty-six days. It announced the Republic of Tule and implemented its territorial borders. A flag was created to symbolise this planned uprising - it was yellow with red stripes on the top and bottom, and a swastika in the middle.

Together the Kuna leaders coordinated attacks on many of the islands that were being controlled by the Panamanian police and government. Marsh assisted in planning these attacks across the islands. They planned the attacks on the main islands whom had been carrying out the Panamanian government's policies which encouraged ethnocide, and implementing the most control on the Kuna people.

The revolt began on 22 February in 1925. It lasted three to four days and resulted in fewer than thirty deaths overall.

=== Lullabies ===
Lullabies played an essential role in the Kuna rebellion. Kuna society is fundamentally matriarchal, and lullaby singing is a key part of their culture. Lullabies are only sung by Kuna women to their children, and the messages conveyed in these lullabies were used to advise children about behavior and common sharing. This made lullabies extremely influential in shaping the mindsets of Kuna children and society as a whole.

During the Revolution, lullabies were used as a means to encourage children to defend their identity and culture. The children were told that they were the superior ethnic group, and that extinction of their culture and people would be disastrous and unrecoverable. These lullabies also had great religious significance as well during this time. Some lullabies recounted that the Kuna had been given a land in which they can live peacefully by their God, Paba Tummat, and in return they must protect this land from foreign intervention.

These lullabies were used as a form of pop culture to influence the younger generation of Guna to protect their culture and identity against the Panamanian government and Western influence.

== Result ==
Through Marsh, the Kuna made an appeal to the United States. Marsh wanted support from the United States following his proclamation of independence. The government of Panama similarly wanted support from the United States government vis-a-vis the Kuna. They had only recently become a republic themselves, and were struggling without support from Colombia.

This resulted in mediation between representatives of the US government, the Panamanian government, and the Kuna leaders. A warship was sent by the Americans to the Gulf of San Blas, and the Panamanians and Kuna were invited to board the ship and negotiate their situation. This mediation resulted in a US-backed agreement for the Kuna people of San Blas to remain independent and isolated from Panama, and to be self-governing. The agreement stated that if they ended hostilities, the Kuna would be able to live as they had before.

The official peace agreement was signed on 4 March, by the American minister, John G. South. In this agreement, the Kuna were promised respect for their traditions and culture, and a cease to certain laws which had imposed on their education system and traditional customs such as their dress. The Panamanian government pledged to protect and support the rights of the Kuna people. In return for this offering, the Kuna promised to cease their revolt by putting down their weapons, and withdraw their declaration of independence. They also promised to abide by the laws and regulations of the Panamanian government so long as they continued to abide by their agreement in respecting Kuna customs.

This peace treaty was later followed by an agreement in 1938 which recognised the Kuna Yala territory as being a reserve, and later the establishment of a representative body (The Kuna General Congress) which would be recognized by the Panamanian government.

=== Politics ===
Following the peace agreement issued in 1925, it took time for the adjustments to be made and for Guna society to integrate into Panamanian politics. Although a few Kuna villages did participate and vote in the Panamanian elections of 1920 and 1924, they did not fully immerse themselves in Panamanian politics until the elections of 1932.

Up until the late 1920s, the Kuna villages were still very much divided into two camps, one being Pro-Colombian and the other Pro-Panamanian due to their history. This resulted in the leaders of both factions voting for different parties in the 1932 election in Panama.

However, by 1935, 1000 Kuna voted in the election, and 2738 voted in 1940. By 1945 Kuna people were recruited at leadership level, this showing their slow but steady inclusion into Panamanian politics.

== San Blas Islands today ==
The Kuna of San Blas, whose population was numbered around 10,000 then, has since increased to around 35,000. There now exist 49 communities across the Kuna Yala region, and the entire region is governed by the Kuna General Congress.

Their economy relies mainly on agriculture, tourism, fishing, and other handiwork production, with the sale of molas and migrant labor being other sources of income.

Despite struggles during the revolution, the making and wearing of molas is still considered to be an important and integral part of Guna identity and culture, and the women are proud to be the only people in the world who can make this dress.

However, more recently internal pressures such as climate and social change have resulted in the Kuna having to expand their tourism industry. The expansion of this industry, enabling more visitors to stay on the Islands, and the development of hotels have been challenging for the Kuna and their culture. Many hotels have exploited Kuna employees and culture. This has resulted in the Kuna controlling and limiting much of the tourism industry, making it much more difficult for Westerners to travel here.

== See also ==
- Guna Yala
- Guna people
- History of Panama (1904–1964)
