= Ernestina Sucre =

- Born: 24 October 1892; Aguadulce, Panama
- Died: 2 July 1982 (aged 89); Panama City, Panama
- Occupation(s): Poet, teacher
- Known for: Creating the Oath to the Flag of Panama, founder of Asociación de Muchachas Guías de Panamá
- Father: Jose Angel Sucre Jimenez

Ernestina Sucre Tapia (November 24, 1892 - July 2, 1982), was a Panamanian teacher and poet who is mostly known for writing the Oath to the Flag of Panama and for founding the Asociación de Muchachas Guías de Panamá.

== Honours ==
- Panama:
  - Commander of the Order of Vasco Núñez de Balboa
