= Mola (art form) =

Guna hand-made textile

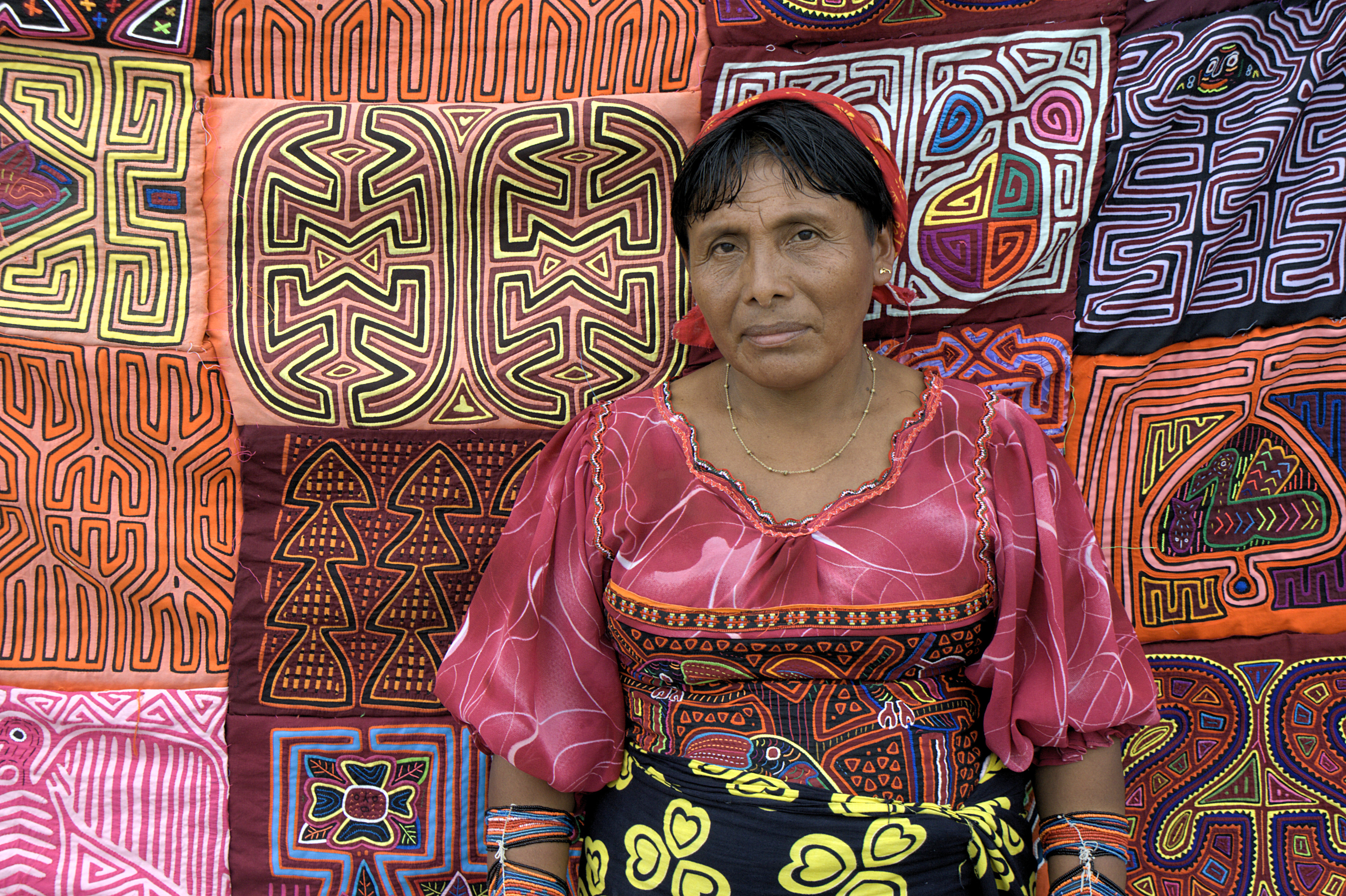
Guna woman selling Molas in Panama City

The Mola or Molas is a hand-made textile that forms part of the traditional women's clothing of the indigenous Guna people from Panama. Their clothing includes a patterned wrapped skirt (saburet), a red and yellow headscarf (musue), arm and leg beads (wini), a gold nose ring (olasu) and earrings in addition to the mola blouse (dulemor). In Dulegaya, the Guna's native language, "mola" means "shirt" or "clothing". The mola originated with the tradition of Guna women painting their bodies with geometric designs, using available natural colors; at a certain point, after the arrival of the Spanish, these same designs were woven in cotton, and later still, sewn using cloth "acquired by trade from the ships that came to barter for coconuts during the 19th century".

== Development of the style ==
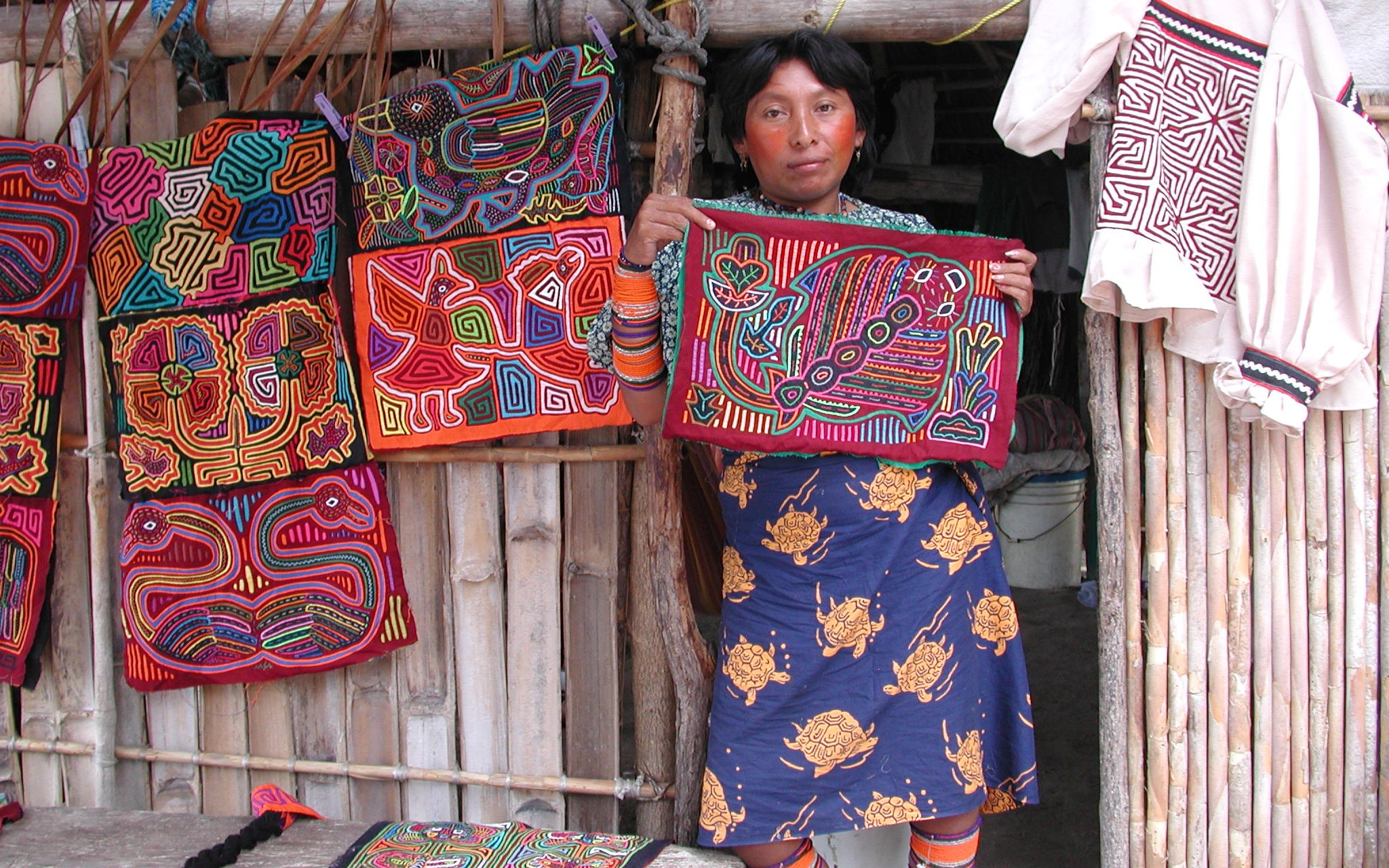
A Guna woman displays a selection of molas for sale at her home in the San Blas Islands.

Molas may have their origin in body painting. In 1514, Pasqual de Andagoya, arrived in Darian and wrote ".. the women are very well dressed, in embroidered cotton mantles which extend down so as to cover their feet, but the arms and bosom are uncovered." They did not wear blouses even in 1688 until they had been introduced by the missionaries.

Only after colonization by the Spanish and contact with missionaries did the Guna start to transfer their traditional geometric designs on fabric, first by painting directly on the fabric and later by using the technique of reverse appliqué. It is not agreed when this technique was first used. It seems to have been popular in the second half of the nineteenth century. In 1924, Lady Brown refers to the dress of the medicine man/ Kantules as "dressed up the knees in long covered with cabalistic characters...all worked into, or let into, the cloth in a form of patchwork."

As an inspiration for their designs, the Guna first used the geometrical patterns which have been used for body painting before. In the past, they have also depicted realistic and abstract designs of flowers, sea animals and birds, and popular culture.

Depending on the tradition of each island, Guna women begin the crafting of molas either after they reach puberty, or at a much younger age. Women who prefer to dress in western style are in the minority as well as in the communities in Panama City.

== Construction ==
Molas are hand-made using a reverse appliqué technique. Several layers (usually two to seven) of different-colored cloth (usually cotton) are sewn together; the design is then formed by cutting away parts of each layer. The edges of the layers are then turned under and sewn down. Often, the stitches are nearly invisible. This is achieved by using a thread the same color as the layer being sewn, sewing blind stitches, and sewing tiny stitches. The finest molas have extremely fine stitching, made using tiny needles.

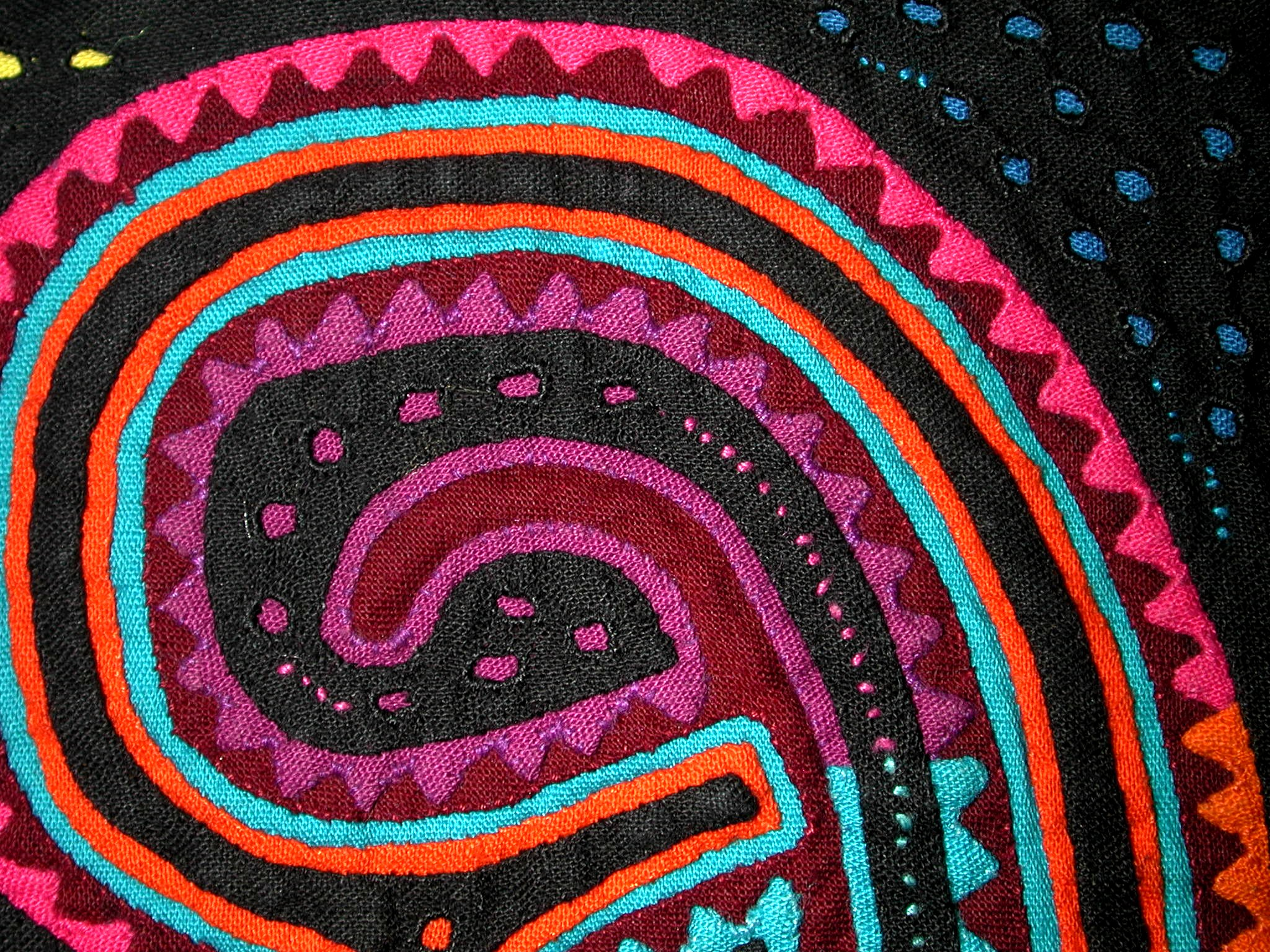
This closeup of a mola by Venancio Restrepo shows the layering of the different colors of cloth, and the fine stitching involved.

The largest pattern is typically cut from the top layer, and progressively smaller patterns from each subsequent layer, thus revealing the colors beneath in successive layers. This basic scheme can be varied by cutting through multiple layers at once, hence varying the sequence of colours; some molas also incorporate patches of contrasting colours, included in the design at certain points to introduce additional variations of color.

Molas vary greatly in quality, and the pricing to buyers varies accordingly. A greater number of layers is generally a sign of higher quality; two-layer molas are common, but examples with four or more layers will command a better price. The quality of stitching is also a factor, with the stitching on the best molas being close to invisible. Although some molas rely on embroidery to enhance the design, a good looking mola is always constructed using the reverse-appliqué method as the leading technique. A mola can take from two weeks to six months to make, depending on the complexity of the design.

== Molas in Guna culture ==
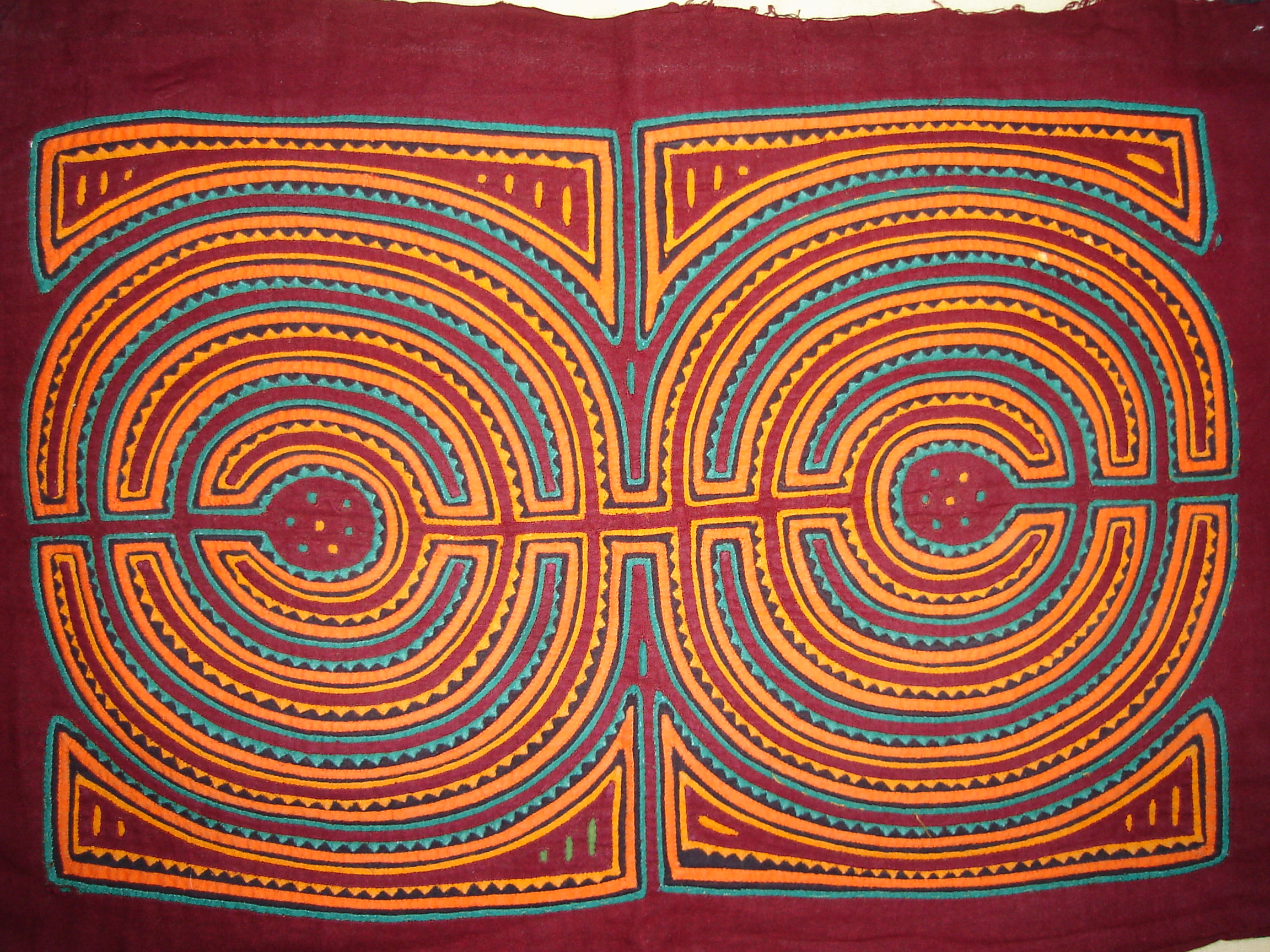
This traditional mola represents the olasu, a nose ring worn by the Guna women.

Several early influences can be attested: a small colony by Christopher Columbus in 1502, a Scottish colony established in the south of Darien, in 1698; the Calvinist or French Huguenots settled and married some Guna women, even though they were killed in 1757. Ultimately a Spanish colony was established in 1790.

By 1907, the traditional costume of a Guna woman consists of a patterned blue cotton wrapped skirt, red and yellow headscarf, arm and leg beads, gold nose rings and earrings and the many layered and finely sewn mola panel blouse.

The artistry of a mola reflects a synthesis of traditional Guna culture with the influences of the modern world. Mola art developed when Guna women had access to store bought yard goods. Mola designs are often inspired by modern graphics such as political posters, labels, pictures from books and TV cartoons, as well as traditional themes from Guna legends and culture.

Geometric molas are the most traditional, having developed from ancient body painting designs. Many hours of careful sewing are required to create a fine mola. The ability to make an outstanding mola is a source of status among Guna women.

The quality of a mola is determined by such factors as the number of layers, fineness of the stitching, evenness and width of cutouts, addition of details such as zigzag borders, lattice-work or embroidery, color combination, and, as Mari Lyn Salvador put it, "skillful manipulation of the technical process and the amount of work involved, together with the design considerations which include filled space, repetition with subtle variation, subtle asymmetry, visibility, complexity, and interesting subject matter".

Since mola panels have been worn as part of the traditional blouse of a Guna woman, they often show signs of wear such as fading and stitch marks along the edges of the panels. These "imperfections" indicate that the mola is authentic and not made solely to be sold to tourists, albeit a strong production of molas for the sole purpose of a sale to outsiders started to flourish after the Second World War. Molas are very sturdy and well sewn. Authentic molas have already been washed many times and can be safely hand washed in warm water. Molas are often sold in pairs, the pair consisting of the back and front panels of a blouse. The two molas are usually two variations on a theme. Matched molas complement each other and should be kept together.

== Banning of molas ==
In 1919, the Panamanian government began a policy of forced assimilation banning molas dress and nose piercing in women. The government introduced these laws to Westernize Guna society and assert control.

There was a strong link between traditional dress and Guna culture and identity. Molas have such an importance for the Guna people and their traditional identity that they can be considered responsible for the independent status of the Comarca Guna Yala.

After the attempt of the Panamanian government to "westernize" the Guna, the Guna greatly objected to the control on their cultural dress, and ethnic identity, and showed great strength in their reaction to the bans implemented by the government, leading to the Guna Revolution.

In 1925 for three years following the revolution, women were required to once again adopt traditional dress as a form of rebellion against the government. Women on Nargana and other more progressive islands were forced to wear mola, even if they had never worn this traditional dress, and their noses had to be pierced by force.
