= Panama Department (1886) =

Former department of Colombia (1886-1903)

Panama Department Departamento de Panamá
- Department of Colombia
- 1886–1903
- Flag Coat of arms

- Panama from 1886 to 1903 under Colombian rule.
- Capital: Panama City
  - Type: Departmental government
- History
  - Regeneration: 7 September 1886
  - Independence: 8 November 1903
Preceded by	Succeeded by
State of Panama	Republic of Panama
- Today part of: Panama

Panama was one of the Departments of Colombia, created under the 1886 constitution. Its predecessor was the State of Panama of the Republic of New Granada (1855–1858), the Granadine Confederation (1858–1863) and the United States of Colombia (1863–1886). In 1903, it achieved independence as the modern Republic of Panama with the concession of the Panama Canal Zone to the United States. Colombia did not formally recognize the sovereignty of Panama until 1909.

A previous incarnation of the Panama Department, also known as the Isthmus Department, was part of Gran Colombia from 1824 to 1831.
