= Justo Arosemena Quesada =

Colombian politician (1817-1896)

Justo Arosemena
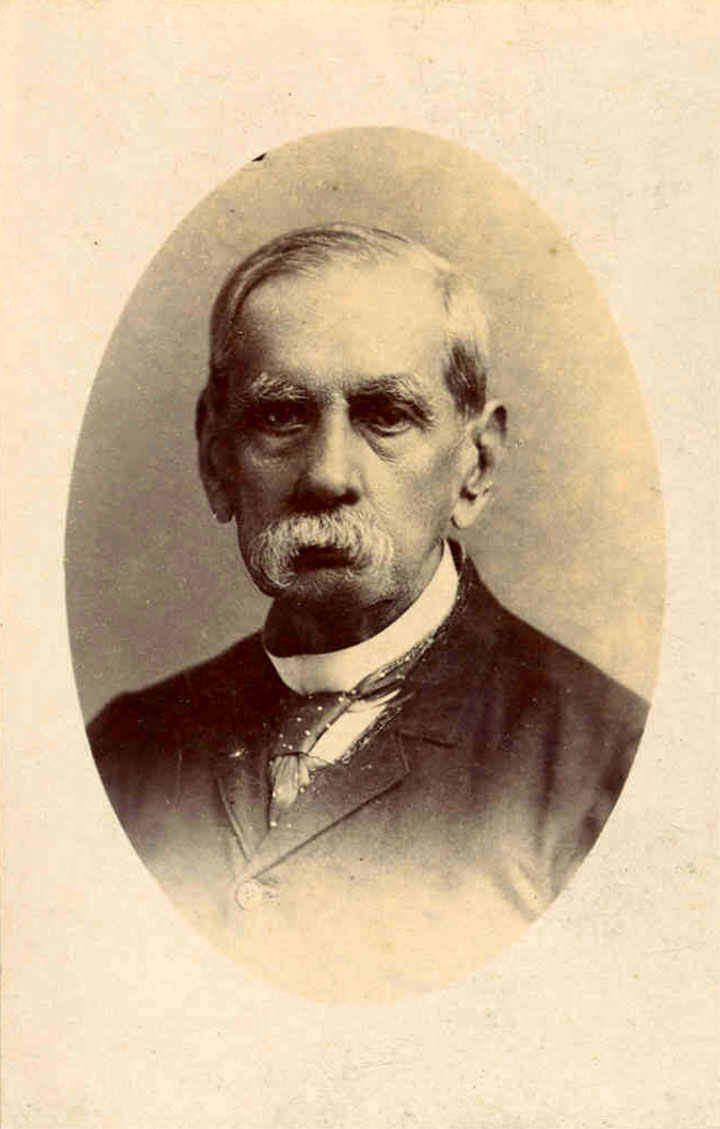
- Born: August 9, 1817; Panama City, Viceroyalty of New Granada, Spanish Empire
- Died: February 23, 1896 (aged 78); Colón, Panama Departament, Colombia
- Known for: Politician, lawyer, writer

Justo Arosemena Quesada (August 9, 1817 – February 23, 1896) was a statesman, writer, lawyer and politician from what is now Panama who lived during the period of union with Colombia. He dedicated his life to the cause of the autonomy of the Isthmus of Panama in and as a part of Colombia, and is regarded as "the father of Panamaian nationalism."

== Biography ==
Arosemena was born in Panama City, the son of Dolores de Quesada and Mariano Arosemena, a national hero during the independence of Panama from Spain in 1821. He attended elementary school in Panama, and when he was 16 years old, he graduated with a Bachelor of Arts from the College of San Bartolomé in Bogotá. Later, he graduated in law at the Universidad Central de Bogota. Between 1837 and 1839 he received his doctorate in law at the Universidad del Magdalena. He also conducted studies in the field of sociology.

He was elected deputy to the Provincial House of Panama (1850–1851), and subsequently as a representative to the National Congress of Colombia (1852–1853). As a statesman, he strongly supported both a respect for human rights and a greater autonomy for the Isthmus of Panama in Colombia. For this reason, the federal state of Panama was created, and he was elected as its first president in 1855. He resigned his position a few months later.

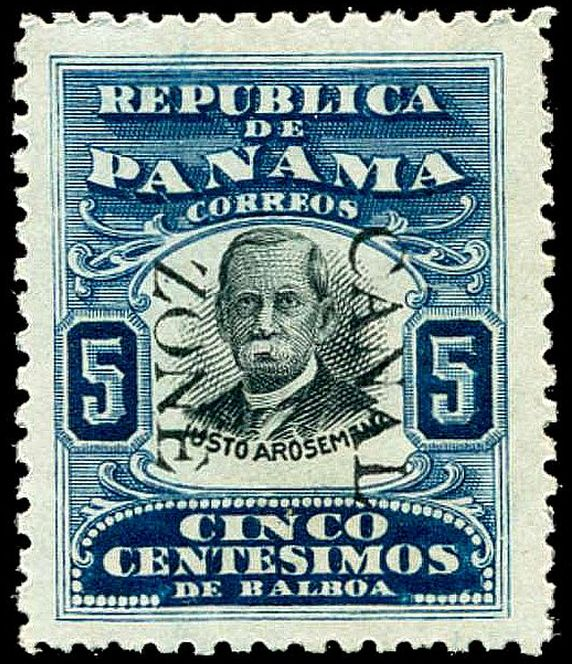
Justo Arosemena Quesada is featured on a Panama Stamp, issued in 1906

By 1863 he was president of the National Convention of Rio Negro, in which Colombia became a confederation of sovereign states, among them Panama. Since 1865, he was involved in diplomacy, was representative of Panama in Washington D.C. for several years, Ambassador of Panama in Chile, Colombia Minister Resident in the United Kingdom, Ambassador Extraordinary and Plenipotentiary in the United Kingdom and France (1872), and intermediary in settling the border between Colombia and Venezuela (1880). In 1868 he was responsible for negotiating the conditions in which Colombia allowed the United States the excavation of a canal in the Isthmus of Panama. He was also a lawyer consultant to the Panama Railroad Company (1888).

In 1878, with the help of the educator José Manuel Hurtado and politician Buenaventura Correoso, he prompted the founding of the first public library in Panama, for which he donated more than 60 volumes related to history and law. In 1886, with the promulgation of the Constitution of Panama, he withdrew himself from public life and he is dedicated to the legal profession until his death in the city of Colón, at the age of 78.

His legacy as a jurist was recognized posthumously when the headquarters of the National Assembly of Panama was named after him.

== Work ==
Justo Arosemena wrote a series of essays that frame his work as a lawyer and sociologist. The most significant of all is "The Federal State of Panama", where he describes the Panamanian history and its nationality, stressing the importance of the isthmus of Panama to become an independent country and describing various geographical, historical and social arguments for the creation of a Panamanian federal state within the confederation of Nueva Granada. In 1855 these ideas were jelled with the creation of the Federal State of Panama. This essay is considered the most comprehensive study on the Panamanian nationality in the 19th century.

As a member of the Congress of Nueva Granada (1850) and as senator of Istmo de Panamá (1853), he authored many legal codifications and was instrumental in bringing about the autonomy of the Colombian federal state of Panama. His extensive drafts of legal codifications, the so-called Proyectos Arosemena, were to become the basis of Panamanian and Colombian legislation in the second half of the 19th century.

== Essays by Arosemena ==
- Aim for the Introduction to the Moral and Political Sciences (1840)
- Consideration on the Frank Communication Between the Oceans (1846)
- Principles of Moral Politics (1849)
- Moral Code Based on the Nature of Man (1860)
- Studies on the Idea of an American League (1864)
- Political Constitutions in South America (1870)
- Constitutional Studies (1878)
- The Institution of Marriage in the United Kingdom (1879)
- The Marriage Before the Law
