= Coat of arms of Gran Colombia =

Arms of the Greater Republic of Colombia
- Adopted: December 17, 1819 (first version); January 10, 1820 (second version); October 6, 1821 (final version)
- Use: Official documents; Military patch

The coat of arms of Gran Colombia was adopted in 1821.

However, there was no single shield model: the first of them was based on the one that was the shield of the First Republic of Venezuela, which was implemented as the national emblem of Gran Colombia, at the request of Simón Bolívar to the Congress of the Republic.

== First version ==
Coat of arms of First Republic of Venezuela (1811)	Arms used from 1817 to 1820.

The first Gran Colombian coat of arms was adopted on December 17, 1819, along with the flag. It was decided that the design of the coat of arms and the flag would be those used by Venezuela in 1811, "for being better known" (at least in Venezuela). This is how the Fundamental Law established it in its article 10, which regulated it as a national emblem:

According to some references, the emblem consisted of an indigenous woman, located to the right of the coat of arms, with feathers on her head and bow on her back holding a spear at the tip of which the Phrygian cap was raised, and at whose feet was an alligator. on the background the sea (the Caribbean) on which a ship was sailing towards the setting sun. Three stars were located on the ceiling, which represented each of the departments then (Venezuela, Cundinamarca and Quito). In the upper part, two hands clasped in a circle of laurels, while intertwined wheat branches supported it by its lower part.

== Second version ==
used from 1820 to 1821.

On January 10, 1820, Francisco de Paula Santander, Vice President of the department of Cundinamarca adopted a new emblem claiming that the national emblems decreed in 1820 were little known and were only used in Venezuela. A year and a half later, on October 6, 1821, the National Congress decreed that the insignia of Cundinamarca should be used on the common flag as part of the national coat of arms, until new emblems were approved. Thus, the coat of arms of Cundinamarca became the national insignia of Gran Colombia, and was officially used in the department of Venezuela.

This Swiss-shaped shield consisted of an open-winged condor on a blue background holding a grenade in one leg and a sword in the other side was devised by Antonio Nariño. Next to this was a chain composed of ten stars, as a symbol of the provinces that were united in 1819, and an iron sphere. At the top of the loop that surrounds the coat of arms was the Latin inscription Vixit et Vincit et Amore Patriae.

== Third version ==
The decree of October 6, 1821 finally approved official insignia for the entire Republic. The new emblem consisted of two cornucopia full of flowers and fruits, symbols of abundance and wealth, which surrounded a bundle of spears and arrows (fasces), like an ax, tied by a tricolor ribbon at the bottom, as a sign of strength and union. Some variants, especially those that went inside the flags, showed the shield surrounded by an oval or a circle with the inscription 'Republic of Colombia', with a small star at the bottom.

== Other versions ==
The proposed coat of arms

On July 11, 1822, the Free Province of Guayaquil joined Gran Colombia. For this reason, the model of a new emblem appeared at the time, many historians believe that a new emblem was indeed regulated. However, there is no document, such as a law or decree, that effectively demonstrates such an event. Apparently this model was part of a project to change the shield and include Guayaquil as part of Gran Colombia, especially through its national insignia, but it is very possible that it was not approved, since the arms used by Nueva Granada, Venezuela and Ecuador once separated from Gran Colombia in 1830 (and that they used to decree their own insignia) on October 6, 1821.

This shield was of the English form, divided into three barracks, each one with a background in the colors of the flag of the Republic. Three silver stars appeared in the upper barracks, representing the initial departments that made up three Republics (Venezuela, Cundinamarca and Quito). Some specimens show different amounts of stars (between nine and twelve), perhaps to denote that new departments were created.

In the lower left barracks there was an indomitable horse as a symbol of freedom, while in the lower right a broken scepter was shown, as a sign of the destroyed royalty. In the upper part of the coat of arms there was an eagle (or condor) with open wings and in its lower part the motto inscribed 'Ser libre o morir' ("Be free or die" or "To be free or die") Surrounding the shield were, on the left, an old man armed with a mace on an amphora with the phrase Orinoco, while on the right a nymph held an olive branch that was stepping on an amphora with the phrase Magdalena.
