= Guna people =

Indigenous people of Panama and Colombia

Guna
Dule
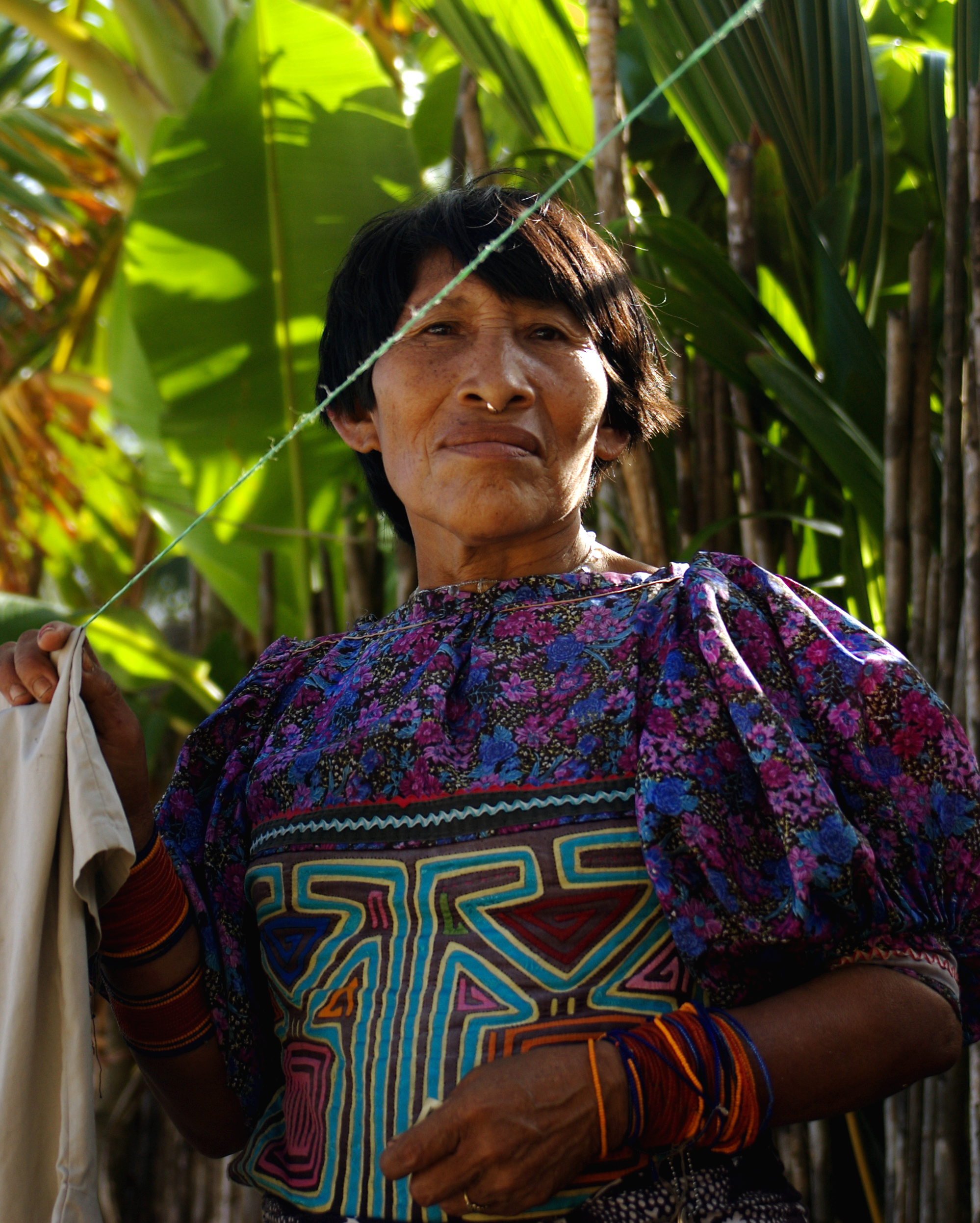
- A Guna woman wearing a mola stands next to a clothes line in Guna Yala, Panama

Total population
- about 50,000

Regions with significant populations
- Panama, Colombia

Languages
- Spanish, Guna

Religion
- traditional Guna religion, Christianity

Related ethnic groups
- other Chibchan-speaking people, Miskito

The Guna (also spelled Kuna or Cuna) are an Indigenous people of Panama and Colombia. Guna people live in three politically autonomous comarcas or autonomous reservations in Panama, and in a few small villages in Colombia. There are also communities of Guna people in Panama City, Colón, and other cities. Most Guna live on small islands off the coast of the comarca of Guna Yala known as the San Blas Islands. The other two Guna comarcas in Panama are Guna de Madugandí and Guna de Wargandí. They are Guna-speaking people who once occupied the central region of what is now Panama and the neighboring San Blas Islands and still survive in marginal areas.

In the Guna language, they call themselves Dule or Tule, meaning "people", and the name of the language is Dulegaya, literally "people-mouth". The term was in the language itself spelled Kuna prior to a 2010 orthographic reform, but the Congreso General de la Nación Gunadule since 2010 has promoted the spelling Guna.

== Political and social organization ==
In Guna Yala, each community has its own political organization, led by a saila (pronounced "sigh-lah" ['saj.la]). The saila is customarily both the political and religious leader of the community; he memorizes songs which relate the sacred history of the people, and in turn transmits them to the people. Decisions are made in meetings held in the Onmaked Nega, or Ibeorgun Nega (Congress House or Casa de Congreso), a structure which likewise serves both political and spiritual purposes. In the Onmaked Nega, the saila sings the history, legends, and laws of the Guna, as well as administering the day-to-day political and social affairs. The saila is usually accompanied by one or more voceros who function as interpreters and counselors for the saila. Because the songs and oral history of the Guna are in a higher linguistic register with specialized vocabulary, the saila's recitation will frequently be followed by an explanation and interpretation from one of the voceros in informal Guna language.

Guna families are matrilinear and matrilocal, with the groom moving to become part of the bride's family. The groom also takes the last name of the bride.

Today there are 49 communities in Guna Yala. The region as a whole is governed by the Guna General Congress, which is led by three Saila Dummagan ("Great Sailas").

== Flag ==
The flag of the Guna Yala community

Alternate version adopted in 1942

The Guna flag was adopted after the 1925 rebellion against Panamanian suppression. Horizontal stripes have a proportion of 1:2:1 and the central swastika is an ancestral symbol called Naa Ukuryaa. According to one explanation, it symbolizes the four sides of the world or the origin from which peoples of the world emerged. In another explanation, it symbolises the octopus that created the world, its tentacles pointing to the four cardinal points. Also known as the flag of Guna Yala island today, the flag was used for the province of San Blas until 2010 and also is used as the Guna ethnic flag. The central stripe, meaning peace and purity, is white on the official flag of the reservation, officially adopted by Guna National Congress, while yellow stripe is used on the ethnic flag (it was introduced on the flag at about 1940). In 1942, the flag was modified with a red ring (representing the traditional Guna nose-ring) encompassing the center of the swastika to avoid Nazi associations.

== Culture ==
The Guna are famous for their bright molas, a colorful textile art form made with the techniques of appliqué and reverse appliqué. Mola panels are used to make the blouses of the Guna women's national dress, which is worn daily by many Guna women. Mola means "clothing" in the Guna language. The Guna word for a mola blouse is Tulemola, (or "dulemola") "Guna people's clothing."

== Economy ==
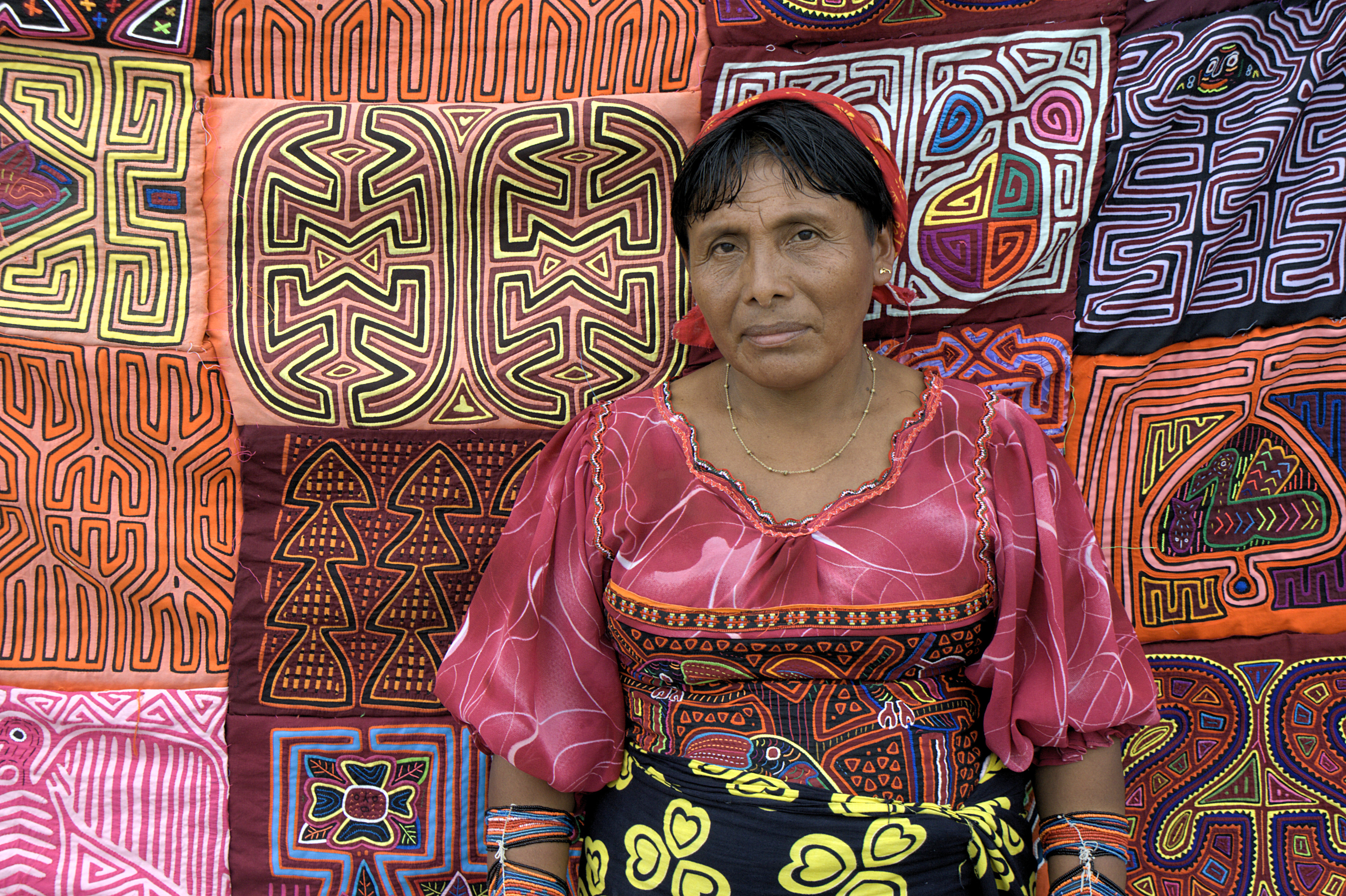
A Guna woman selling molas in Panama City

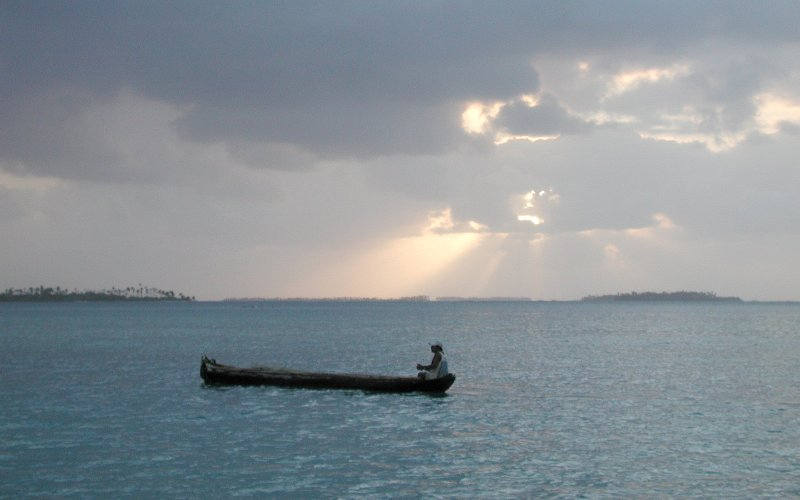
A Guna man fishing in a hand-built dugout canoe

The economy of Guna Yala is based on agriculture, fishing and the manufacture of clothing with a long tradition of international trade. Plantains, coconuts, and fish form the core of the Guna diet, supplemented with imported foods, a few domestic animals, and wild game. Coconuts, called ogob [okˑɔβ] in the Guna language, and lobsters skungit [skuŋkˑit] are the most important export products. Migrant labor and the sale of molas provide other sources of income.

The Guna have a long deep rooted history of mercantilism and a longstanding tradition of selling goods through family owned venues. Most imported goods originate from Colombian, Mexican or Chinese ships and are sold in small retail stores owned by Guna people. The Guna have not excised tax when trading goods and place strong emphasis on economic success. This tradition of trade and self-determination has been credited by many as a chief reason the Guna have been able to successfully function independently compared to other Indigenous groups.

Guna communities in Panama City are typically made up of migrant laborers and small business owners, although many Guna also migrate to Panama City to sell fish and agricultural products produced by their respective communities. The sale of Mola and other forms of Guna art has become a large part of the Guna people's economy in recent years and mola vendors can be found in most cities in Panama where they are marketed to both foreigners and Hispano Panamanians. Tourism is now an important part of the economy in the Carti region, and abandoned goods from the drug trade provide occasional windfalls.

== History ==
Guna people were living in what is now Northern Colombia and the Darién Province of Panama at the time of the Spanish invasion, and only later began to move westward towards what is now Guna Yala due to a conflict with the Spanish and other Indigenous groups. Centuries before the conquest, the Gunas arrived in South America as part of a Chibchan migration moving east from Central America. At the time of the Spanish invasion, they were living in the region of Uraba and near the borders of what are now Antioquia and Caldas. Alonso de Ojeda and Vasco Núñez de Balboa explored the coast of Colombia in 1500 and 1501. They spent the most time in the Gulf of Urabá, where they made contact with the Gunas.

During the first decades of the twentieth century, the Panamanian government attempted to suppress many of the traditional customs. This was bitterly resisted, culminating in a short-lived yet successful revolt in 1925 known as the Dule Revolution (or "people revolution") – led by Iguaibilikinya Nele Kantule of Ustupu and supported by American adventurer and part-time diplomat Richard Oglesby Marsh – and a treaty in which the Panamanians agreed to give the Guna some degree of cultural autonomy.

The San Blas Islands could be rendered uninhabitable by sea level rise in the late 21st century. In early 2025, the Guna community of Gardi Sugdub was evacuated from the island to a purpose built new township on the mainland due to the rising sea-level.

== Language ==
The Guna language, natively Dulegaya, is an Indigenous language of the Chibchan family spoken by 50,000 to 70,000 people. It is the primary language of daily life in the comarcas, and the majority of Guna children speak the language. Although it is relatively viable, Guna is considered an endangered language.

Spanish is also widely used, especially in education and written documents.

== Health ==
The Guna have been shown to have a low average blood pressure (B.P., 110/70 mm Hg), and, do not experience the age-related increase in blood pressure that is common in Western society. Death rates from cardiovascular disease (C.V.D.) and cancer – the #1 and #2 causes of death in the U.S. – are low in the Guna. Between 2000 and 2004 in mainland Panama, for every 100,000 residents, 119 died from C.V.D. and 74 died from cancer; in contrast, per 100,000 Guna, these death rates were 8 for C.V.D. and 4 for cancer.

== Albinism ==
Guna children in 1927. The child in the center is albinistic.

Guna people have a high incidence rate of albinism, which led to their nickname of "White Indians" in the early 1900s. In Guna philosophy, the albinistic people (or "sipu") were given a special place and are considered a special race of people. They have the specific duty of defending the moon against a dragon which tries to eat it on occasion during a lunar eclipse, and only they are allowed to go outside on the night of a lunar eclipse and to use specially made bows and arrows to shoot down the dragon.

== See also ==
- Cartí Sugtupu
