= Coat of arms of Panama =

- Armiger: Republic of Panama
- Adopted: 4 June 1904
- Crest: In place of a crest, a harpy eagle rising with wings displayed and elevated argent ensigned by an arc of ten stars Or, and holding in its beak an escrol bearing the motto
- Shield: Quarterly: first argent, a sabre and rifle saltireways proper; second gules, a spade and hoe also saltireways and proper; third azure, a cornucopia with mouth downwards discharging coins Or; fourth argent, a winged wheel Or. Overall, a fess charged with a landscape of the isthmus of Panama with a setting sun and a rising moon, all proper.
- Supporters: In place of supporters four banners, being quarterly: the first and fourth argent, the second gules, the third azure, with a star azure in the first quarter and another gules in the fourth.
- Motto: Pro Mundi Beneficio (Latin: "For the benefit of the World")

The Panamanian coat of arms is a heraldic symbol for Panama. These arms were adopted provisionally and then definitively by the same laws that adopted the Panamanian flag.

The harpy eagle (Harpia harpyja), the Panamanian national bird, is the species of eagle on this coat of arms.

== Description ==
The center section contains the Isthmus of Panama. The chief or top part of the coat of arms comprises two quarters. The top left over a field of silver a sword and a rifle. In 1904, the arms were made official by Law 64 of 4 June 1904 signed by the President of Assembly Genaro Ortega, and sanctioned by the President the Republic, Manuel Amador Guerrero.

The official description of the heraldic design is as follows:

Panamanian coat of arms on a green field

- "It rests on a green field, symbol of the vegetation; it is of pointed form and it is intervened as far as the division. The center shows the Isthmus with its seas and sky, in which the moon begins to rise above the waves and the sun begins to hide behind the mountain, marking thereby the solemn hour of the declaration of our independence. The head is divided in two quarters: in the one of the right hand, in the silver field, a sword and a gun are hung meant as abandonment for always to the civil wars, causes of our ruin; in the one of the left-hand side, and on field of gules, a crossed shovel and a grub hoe are shown shining, to symbolize the work."
- "The end of the coat of arms also is divided in two quarters: the one of the right-hand side, in blue field, shows a cornucopia, emblem of the wealth; and the one of the left-hand side, in field of silver, the winged wheel, symbol of the progress. Behind the shield and covering it with his opened wings, is the eagle, emblem of the sovereignty, the head turned towards the left, and takes in the tip a silver tape, which hangs from right to left. On the tape the following motto is printed "Pro Mundi Beneficio."
- "On the eagle, in arc form, ten gold stars go in representation of the provinces in which the Republic is divided. Like decorative accessories, to each side of the coat of arms two gathered national flags go on the other hand below."

For thirty-seven years the coat of arms of the Republic of Panama was not changed until the Constitution of 1941 was promulgated. The National Assembly dictated in March of that year Law 28 on the coat of arms, in which the following reforms were introduced: the saber and the gun are meant as "attitude of alert in defense of our sovereignty" in place of "abandonment to mean goodbye to the civil wars". 311 projects appeared to change the motto and the Jury named to make the selection decided in favor of: "Solo Dios sobre Nosotros" (Only God Above Us). Nevertheless, the National Assembly when approving the Law 28 already referred to, rejected it and preferred the one of "Justice, Honor and Freedom". Five years later, in 1946, Panama returned to the old symbol with the well-known motto of "Pro Mundi Beneficio".

The formal adoption and regulation of the use of the national flag, anthem and coat of arms were decreed by law 34 of 1949.

== Harpy Eagle Law ==
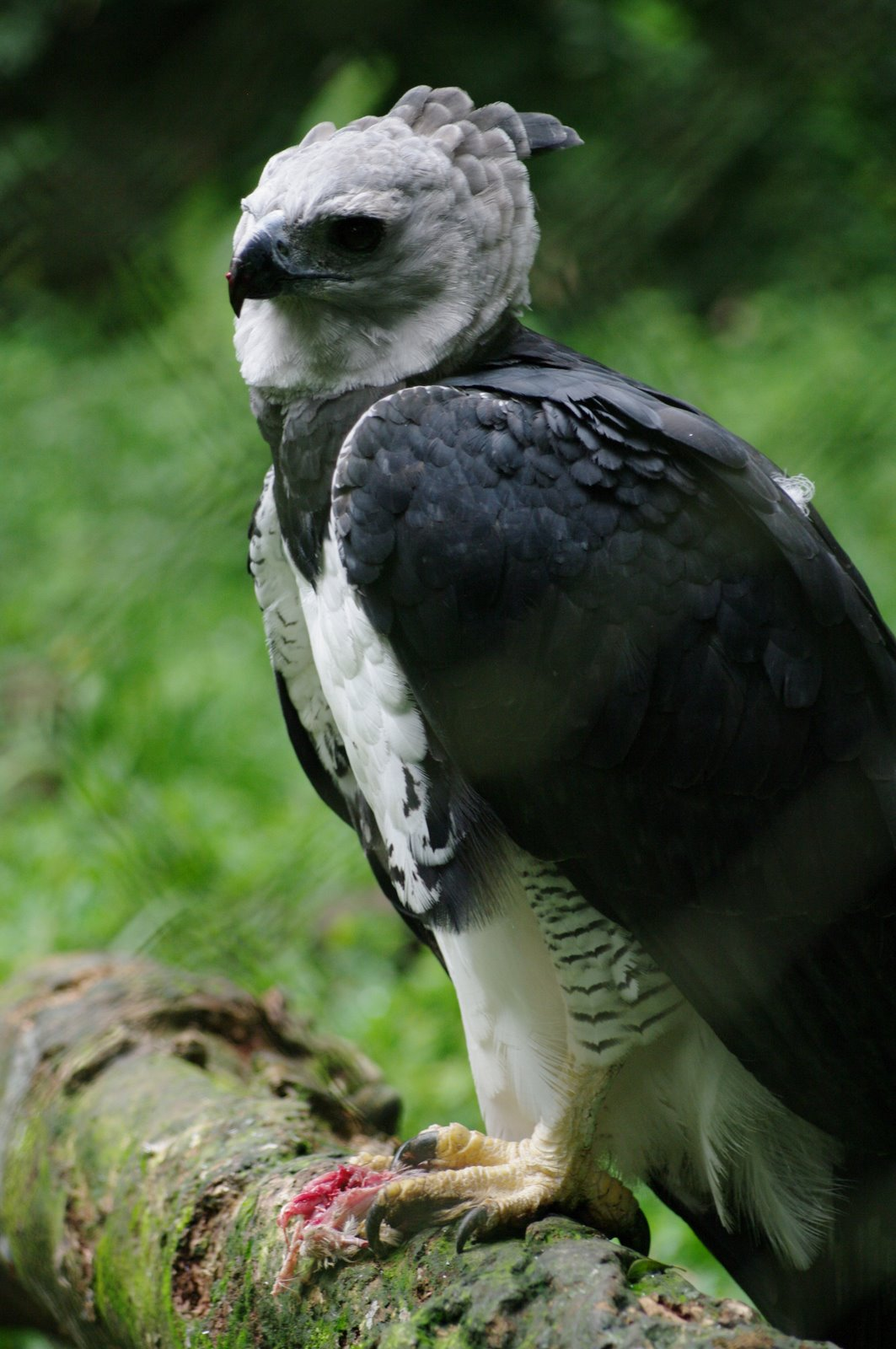
Adult harpy eagle at the São Paulo Zoo

Law 34 of 1949 stated, as noted above, that an eagle was to be on the top of the coat of arms. However, it did not specify what species of eagle, even though in most schools the harpy eagle was the eagle species on top of the coat of arms.

Law 18 of 2002 made the harpy eagle (Harpia harpyja) the national bird; and to specify what species of eagle was to be on the coat of arms, on May 17, 2006, law 50 was approved by the national Assembly to modify law 18 of 2002, and add that the harpy eagle (Harpia harpyja) was the species of eagle that appears on the coat of arms of the Republic of Panama.

== Gallery ==
Historical Coat of arms

Federal State of Panama (1858–1863)

Sovereign State of Panama (1863–1886)

(1903–1904)

(1904–1925)

(1925–1941)

(1941–1946)

(1946–2006)

(2006–2014)

== See also ==
- Flag of Panama
