= Colón Department (Colombia) =

Former department of Panama State, Colombia

Colón Department was one of the departments of the State of Panama, one of the states of Colombia.
