= Asociación de Muchachas Guías de Panamá =

Guiding organization in Panama

- Girl Guide Association of Panama
- Headquarters: Sede Nacional Calle 3era. Perejil "ITABE", Ciudad de Panamá. Apartado: 7676 Panamá 9 Panamá
- Country: Panama
- Founded: 1950
- Membership: 751
- President: Ulina Mapp
- Affiliation: World Association of Girl Guides and Girl Scouts
- Website www.guiaspanama.com

The Asociación de Muchachas Guías de Panamá (AMGP, Girl Guide Association of Panama) is the national Guiding organization of Panama. It serves 751 members (as of 2003). Founded in 1950 by Ernestina Sucre, the girls-only organization became a full member of the World Association of Girl Guides and Girl Scouts in 1952.

The Girl Guide emblem incorporates a map of Panama.

== See also ==
- Asociación Nacional de Scouts de Panamá
