= Nele Kantule =

Chief of indigenous Kuna people

Nele Kantule (sitting) in 1927

Nele Kantule Iguibilikinya (1868–1944) was a famous chief and medicine man of the Guna indigenous tribe of Panama.

== Biography ==
He was born in Putorgandi, in what is today Ustupu Island, Panama. He was a leader of the Guna from early in the twentieth century until his death.

His life was described by Erland Nordenskiöld, in his 1938 book on the Guna, An historical and ethnological survey of the Cuna Indians.
