= State of Panama =

1855–1903 state of Colombia

Coordinates: 8°58′N 79°32′W

Federal State of Panama / Sovereign State of Panama Estado Soberano de Panamá
- 1855–1886
- Flag Seal

- Status: State in Republic of New Granada, Granadine Confederation and United States of Colombia
- Capital: Panama City
- Religion: Roman Catholic
- Government: Federal republic
- History
  - Established: 1855
  - Disestablished: 1886
- Currency: Peso
| Preceded by | Succeeded by |
| Provinces of the Republic of New Granada | Panama Department (1886) |
- Today part of: Panama

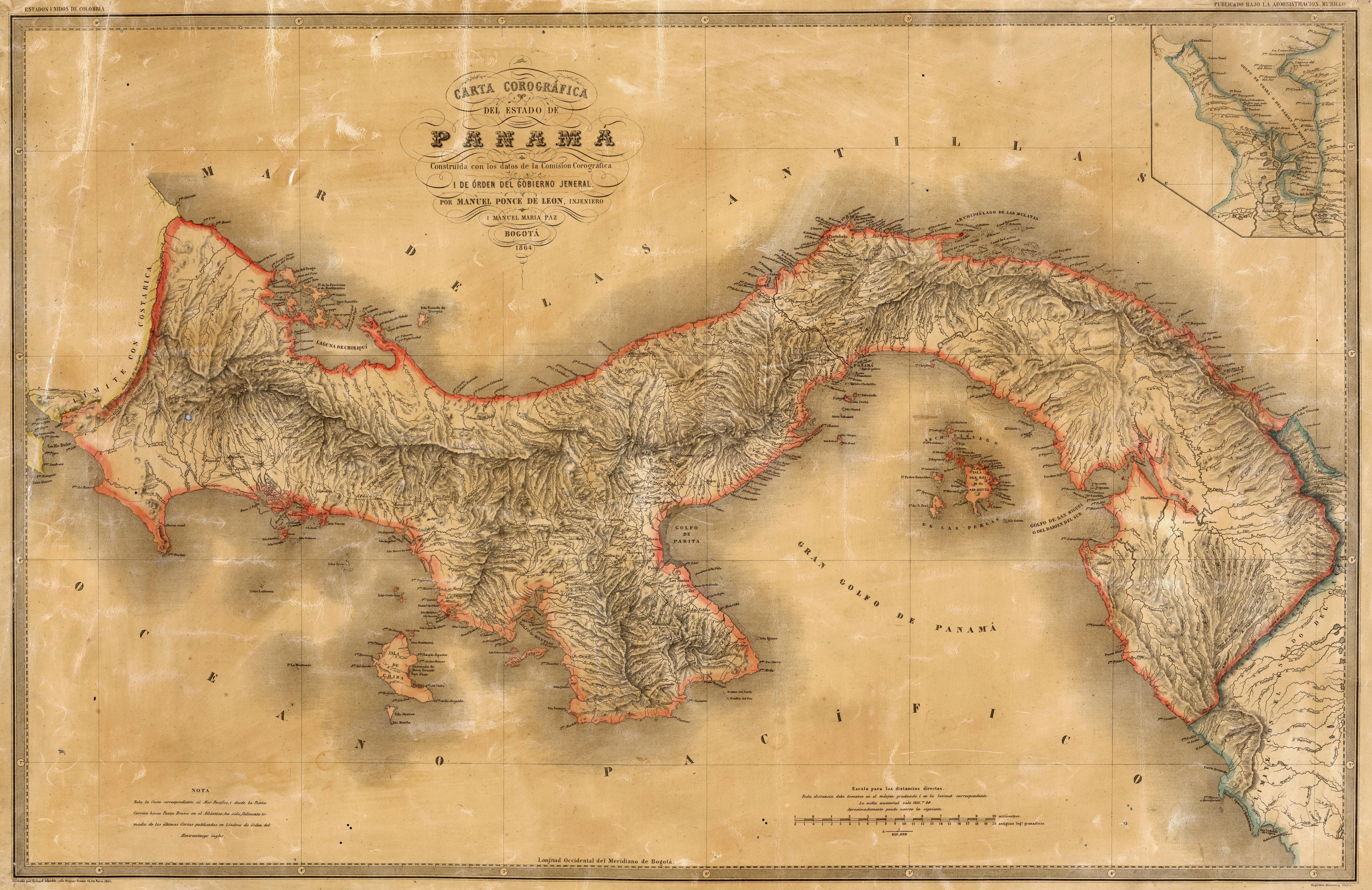
Panama State (1865 map by Agostino Codazzi)

The State of Panama, officially known as the Federal State of Panama from 1855 to 1863, and as the Sovereign State of Panama from 1863 until 1886 when it was dissolved, was established as one of the states of the Republic of New Granada, and later part of the Granadine Confederation, and the United States of Colombia. The state was established on 27 February 1855 and lasted until 1886 when it was replaced by the Department of Panama. In 1903, the territory of the Panama State achieved independence as the Republic of Panama.

== History ==
It was the first state to form within the Granadine Confederation of 1858, due to desires for autonomy, particularly by the Istmo Province.

== Limits ==
- North Atlantic Ocean
- East Cauca State
- South Pacific Ocean
- West Costa Rica.

== Subdivisions ==
The state was initially divided in the same provinces that created it in 1855:

- Panamá Province (capital: Ciudad de Panamá).
- Azuero Province (capital: La Villa de Los Santos).
- Chiriquí Province (capital: San José de David).
- Veraguas Province (capital: Santiago de Veraguas).

At the end of the year the territory of Azuero Province was split between Panama Province and Chiriquí Province.

During the administration of Justo Arosemena (1856), the State was divided into 7 departments:

- Coclé Department (capital: Natá).
- Colón Department (capital: Colón).
- Chiriquí Department (capital: David).
- Fábrega Department (capital: Santiago).
- Herrera Department (capital: Pesé).
- Los Santos Department (capital: La Villa de Los Santos).
- Panamá Department(capital: Ciudad de Panamá).

Later, during the administration of José Leonardo Calancha (1864), reduced the number of departments to 6:

- Coclé Department (capital Penonomé).
- Colón Department (capital Colón).
- Chiriquí Department (capital David).
- Los Santos Department (capital La Villa de Los Santos).
- Panamá Department (capital Panamá).
- Veraguas Department (capital San Francisco de la Montaña).
