= Panama at the 2011 World Aquatics Championships =

Sporting event delegation

Flag of Panama

Panama competed at the 2011 World Aquatics Championships in Shanghai, China between July 16 and 31, 2011.

== Swimming ==
Panama qualified 3 swimmers.

Men

Athlete	Event	Heats		Semifinals		Final	
Athlete	Event	Time	Rank	Time	Rank	Time	Rank
Édgar Crespo	Men's 50m Breaststroke	28.15	21	did not advance			
Édgar Crespo	Men's 100m Breaststroke	1:01.94	40	did not advance			
Édgar Crespo	Men's 200m Breaststroke	2:17.38	36	did not advance			
Édgar Crespo	Men's 100m Butterfly	57.24	52	did not advance			
Diego Castillo Granados	Men's 200m Butterfly	2:00.80	31	did not advance			
Diego Castillo Granados	Men's 400m IM	4:32.39	30			did not advance	

Women

Athlete	Event	Heats		Semifinals		Final	
Athlete	Event	Time	Rank	Time	Rank	Time	Rank
Zamantha Hoss	Women's 50m Freestyle	28.19	49	did not advance			
Zamantha Hoss	Women's 100m Freestyle	1:02.12	58	did not advance			
