= Flag of Panama =

Republic of Panama
- Bandera de Panamá
- Use: National flag and ensign
- Proportion: 2:3
- Adopted: March 25, 1925; 101 years ago (Standardized on December 22, 2017; 8 years ago)
- Design: Divided into four rectangles. Going clockwise from the top-left: a blue star, a red rectangle, a red star, and a blue rectangle.
- Designed by: María de la Ossa de Amador
- Use: Presidential standard
- Design: The national flag with the Coat of arms of Panama charged on the center.

The national flag of Panama was made by María de la Ossa de Amador and was officially adopted by the "ley 48 de 1925". The Panamanian flag day is celebrated on November 4, one day after the Panamanian separation from Colombia, and is one of a series of holidays celebrated in November known as the Fiestas Patrias.

The first flag proposed in 1903 consisted of thirteen horizontal stripes of alternating red and yellow, with a blue canton containing two golden suns, joined by a narrow line to depict North and South America joined by the Isthmus of Panama (see the depiction below). However, this was not accepted by the Panamanian leader, Manuel Amador Guerrero, whose family designed a new flag.

The stars and quarters are said to stand for the rival political parties, and the white is said to stand for the peace in which they operate. Blue was the color of the Conservatives and red was the color of the Liberals.

== History ==
=== Bunau-Varilla proposal ===
Reconstruction of the Bunau-Varilla design

Original design of the flag, according to Manuel E. Amador. It was the first flag of Panama, from November 3, 1903 to 1904

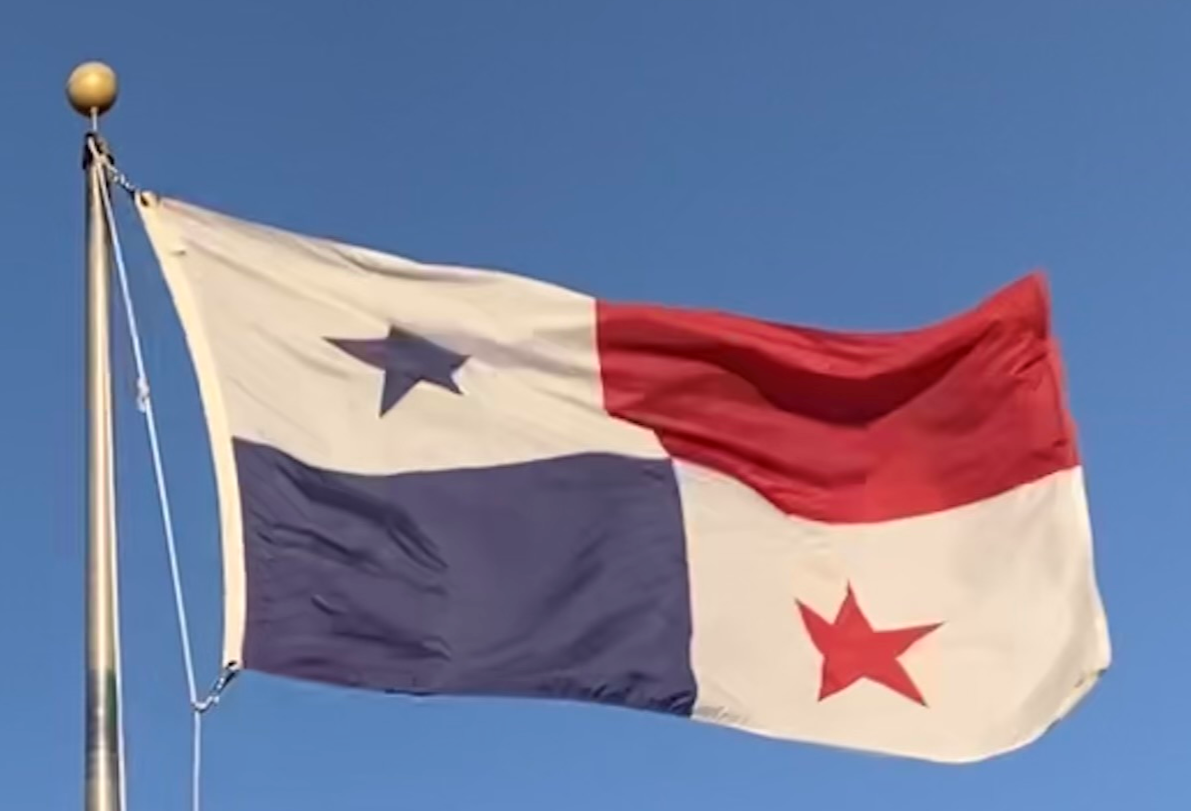
Flag of Panama flying from a pole

The wife of Philippe-Jean Bunau-Varilla designed the first serious proposal for a Panamanian flag. Bunau-Varilla's design was based on the flag of the United States, possibly on account of that country's hand in Panamanian independence. Retaining the thirteen stripes, she changed the white stripes to yellow, emphasizing the Panamanian connection to Colombia and Spain (whose flags both prominently feature red and yellow). Bunau-Varilla replaced the stars in the blue canton with two interconnected yellow suns; the suns represent North and South America, and are connected because of Panama's position connecting the two continents. Bunau-Varilla's proposal was rejected by Manuel Amador Guerrero and his fellow revolutionaries because it was too similar to the U.S. flag, and they, therefore, gave the task of designing a flag to Guerrero's son.

=== María de la Ossa de Amador proposal ===
The original Panamanian flag was made by María de la Ossa de Amador, the first First Lady of Panama, on November 1, 1903. Manuel Amador Guerrero's son, Manuel Encarnación Amador, generally recognized as a skillful draftsman, sketched the flag and showed it to María de la Ossa de Amador, who, after much difficulty in avoiding the Colombian army, eventually produced three copies of the flag, with help from her sister-in-law Angélica Bergamonta de la Ossa and niece, María Emilia de la Ossa Bergamonta. All three flags were flown in Panama City upon independence, and distributed widely. The original flag differs from the present flag in that the upper left quadrant was blue. After independence, when blue was chosen as a color of one of the political parties, the quadrants were shifted to make the top left quadrant white.

== Description ==
The Panamanian government officially described the flag in law on December 15, 1949, as follows:

The Flag of the Republic consists thus of a divided rectangle of four quarters: the upper field close to the pole white with a blue star of five points; the upper field further from the pole, red; the lower field near the pole, blue; and the lower one further from the pole, white with a red star of five points.

This flag was to reflect the political situation of the time:

- The blue was intended to represent the Conservative Party;
- The red to represent the Liberal Party;
- The white was intended to stand for peace and purity;
- The blue star stands for the purity and honesty of the life of the country;
- The red star represents the authority and law in the country, and together the stars stand for the new republic.

=== Color scheme ===
The official colors of the Panamanian flag were established by decree 337 of 2017 on December 22, 2017. The colors are:

Colours scheme	Blue	Red	White
RGB	7,35,87	218,18,26	255,255,255
Hexadecimal	#072357	#DA121A	#FFFFFF
Pantone	295C/296U	187C/186U	-
CMYK	100-46-0-70	0-100-79-20	0-0-0-0

The London Organising Committee of the Olympic and Paralympic Games listed the Pantone colours of the flag as red: 186 and blue: 300.

== Protocol ==
=== Daily use ===
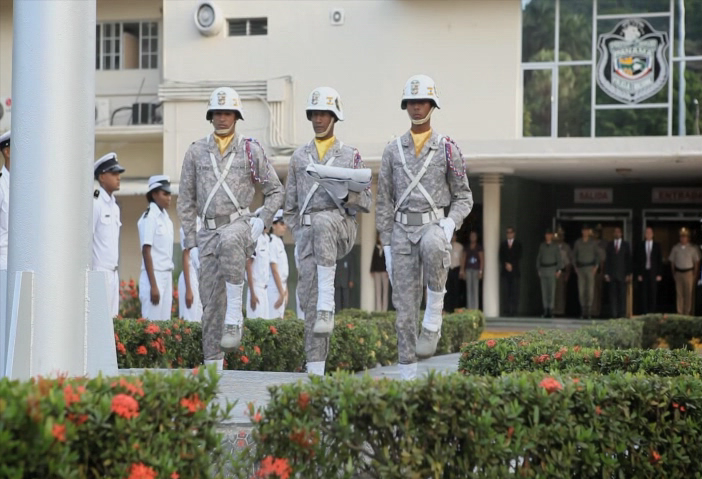
National flag hoisting ceremony at the National Police Headquarters.

The Panamanian flag can only be hoisted if it is in good condition and it must be hoisted after seven in the morning and lowered before six in the evening. The rope of the flagpole must be white and braided with a thickness of 1/4 inch, and the flagpole must have a height of six times the width of the flag, except when the flag has a special dimensions. In the following places it must always be flown:

- Buildings of both autonomous and semi-autonomous public institutions.
- In all vessels with Panamanian registration.
- In all foreign ships that arrive at ports of the Republic of Panama.
- In the buildings of the delegations, embassies and consulates of the Republic of Panama.
- In all the schools of the Republic during their working hours.

When the flag is hoisted, the most due respect must be shown, also at the time of its lowering; people with hats or caps should remove them from their heads and cross their right hand over their chest with the hat on it and women should place their right hand over their heart. It should always be vigorously hoisted and ceremoniously lowered. In case of adverse weather conditions, the flag must be lowered immediately and taken to a safe place where it will be folded. At the time of lowering the flag, it must not touch the ground or anything below it.

When hoisting or lowering in a formed group, three people must be placed in front of the pole on the side corresponding to the upper ring of the support:

- The one who raises and lowers the flag;
- The one who keeps the rope taut;
- The one who receives or displays the flag.

The flag and the anthem are different symbols and therefore each one has a different protocol. The flag is never raised at the time of singing the national anthem, it must always be raised before singing it. The bugle call or drum roll is optional, at the time of hoisting, according to decree 244 of 1971.

=== Civic act ===
Every Monday, at 7 in the morning including on national holidays, in both private and official schools the civic act is carried out, it must have the following elements:

- All staff on campus at that time.
- An escort made up of three people.
- A master of ceremonies.

The act itself consists of the following steps:

- Flag walk
- Oath
- Secondary acts (messages, prayer, etc.)
- Singing of the National Anthem

=== Oath ===
The oath to the Panamanian flag was devised by Ernestina Sucre (founder of the Girl Guides) and was adopted by Law 24 of 1959 and confirmed by Law 34 of 1949 in the single text that reflects the reforms of Law 2 of 2012. The oath must always be recited after the flag has been raised.

It is said as follows, raising the right hand at a 90º angle and showing the palm of the hand:

Spanish: Bandera Panameña, Juro a Dios y a la Patria, amarte, respetarte y defenderte, como símbolo sagrado de nuestra Nación
English: Panamanian flag: I swear to God and the Homeland, to love, respect and defend you, as a sacred symbol of our Nation

=== Using the flag on other sites ===
It is allowed by law that residences be decorated with pennants, banners, banners and others that are variants of the colors of the national flag. On the following occasions, decoration with the national flag or pennants, banners and the like is allowed:

- On national holidays
- On days when achievements of the republic are celebrated
- On national days of friendly countries
- On the dates of death of illustrious Panamanians as a shroud after being authorized by the Executive Branch.

The national flag by law, its use in places of nightlife, brothels, in advertising messages, commercial signs, commercial products and animals is prohibited.

Foreign citizens are allowed to use their national flag on the aforementioned occasions, also at the time of celebrations of their respective nations, as long as the Panamanian flag is placed with the same respect, size and quality as foreign flags.

=== Fold ===
How to fold the flag of Panama

To fold the flag two people are necessary. After removing the hooks from the rope and stretching the flag out, it is shaken to remove any foreign body that rests on the flag (I). It is then inspected for any damage or fading of the colors. It is folded in half, leaving the blue and white cantons with the red star facing up (II); then it is folded in half again so that the corner with the blue star and the red corner are facing upwards (III). Finally, it is folded in the shape of a right triangle, starting with the red corner (IV), proceeding until it is completely folded. In the end, the white canton should cover the entire exterior of the flag (V).

=== Placement ===
How to place the flag of Panama

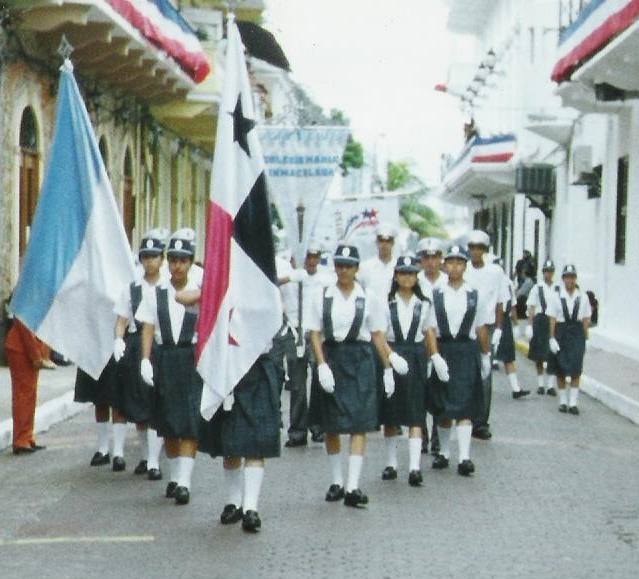
The flag of Panama in a parade

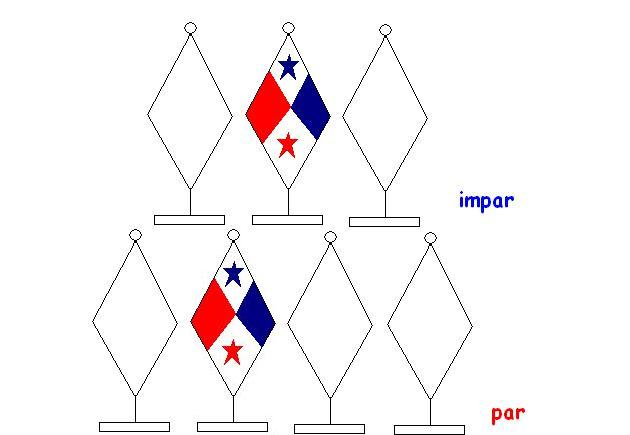
Placement of the flag of Panama in a group of flags

The national flag has rules and regulations regarding its use in different events worldwide. Among these are the following:

- On balconies it is used as follows:
  - Horizontal: It is placed the way it is hoisted on a pole.
  - Vertical: it is placed with the corner of the blue star to the upper left side of the observer.
- In the parades and parades : in the days of national holidays, of achievements of great importance for the republic or in the funerals of an illustrious Panamanian (with the remains present), the national flag will be placed at the head of the parade and of each delegation to participate in it, this one with an escort. The pole must not have an inclination greater than 45º.
- In case other flags go next to it, the flag will go in case of being an even number of flags in the right center; if there is an odd number of flags, it will go to the center of these. In case of carrying flags behind it, they will go with the same size and quality as the Panamanian flag.
- When it is placed with other flags : in case of being placed with an even number of flags, it is placed in the left center of the observer. In case of being placed with an odd number of flags, it must be placed in the center of the group. When the Panamanian flag is displayed with a flag of another nation with crossed flagpoles, the Panamanian flag must be to the left of the observer and its flagpole over the other flagpole. The flag must reach the highest point of the mast first when flown alongside flags of other nations; when lowering it must arrive last.
- At funerals : when used to cover a coffin, it should be placed so that the ties are at the head of the deceased and the white quarter with the blue star on the left side.
- It should always go to the right of altars and a speaker.
- Two Panamanian flags must never be crossed.
- The flag does not bow to anyone or anything, on any occasion.

=== Flag at half mast ===
The national flag is placed at half mast as a symbol of respect of the Panamanian people for a loss or tragic event that is occurring. To place the flag at half mast, it is fully hoisted and then lowered until it reaches half, when lowering it, it is done in reverse, hoisting the flag to the mast and then ceremoniously lowering it. The flag will be flown at half mast at the following times:

- Death of the President of the Republic.
- Death of a former President of the Republic.
- Death of the Vice President or Ministers of State.
- Death of a high-ranking official of the national government.
- Death of a Member of the National Assembly.
- Death of a Justice of the Supreme Court of Justice.
- Death of an illustrious Panamanian (winner of a national or Panamanian order that has excelled internationally).
- Death of an illustrious person worldwide.
- When a natural disaster of great magnitude occurs to a friendly nation.

=== Sacrileges ===
According to the laws that govern the use of national symbols, the flag is subject to improper use, disrespect or irreverence in the following cases:

- Being cut or burned in a protest
- To be used in commercial articles incorporating it into a brand or commercial or political slogan.
- Appear in an advertising guideline that associates it as part of the product.
- Being raised in places of nightlife or its placement in places of dubious reputation or liquor outlet.
- When incurring in one of these situations and depending on the degree of disrespect given to the national flag, the Law establishes sanctions after they are reported to the Mayor's Office of the place where the abuse occurred.

=== Destruction ===
When the national flag reaches the end of its period of use (faded colors, tears), it will be removed from functions and burned in a solemn ceremony.

The flags must be burned in a public and open place so that anyone who wishes to pay their last respects to the national flag can attend. In addition to this, the following elements must exist:

- An oven to incinerate the flags
- A tray to collect the ashes
- A hole in the ground to deposit the ashes
- The flags that will be burned
- The oven is the main element of the ceremony, it must be open and made of heat-resistant material (usually they are built from oil tanks split in half), with a hole at the bottom to let the ashes out; The oven must have an expanded steel mesh to separate the flags from the fuel and the legs of the oven must be iron, 1/4 inch wide and 24 inches long. Under the rules of flag cremation, only mangrove wood can be used for fuel and can only ignite itself without the aid of fossil fuels .

To the cremation ceremony, each Government will invite the people, institutions and forces that it deems appropriate, such as:

- Representatives of the institutions that will cremate their flags
- A representative of the Girl Guides
- Civic club representatives
- A representative of the community where the event is held
- Before proceeding with the cremation, a speech is made about the national flag and its importance in the institutions that will cremate their flags; after this, the oath to the flag is recited.
- The previously folded flags are cremated.

When finished, the ashes are collected and buried with due respect.

== Historical national flags ==
Cross of Burgundy, The first Spanish flag. Used as the flag of the Spanish Empire (1492–1898) and used until 1793.

, Flag of Spain (1786–1821)

The third flag of Gran Colombia, between 1821 and 1830.

Provisional flag of the Republic of New Granada, effective between 1830 and May 9, 1834

Flag of the Republic of New Granada and the Grenadine Confederation, effective between May 9, 1834, and July 26, 1861.

Flag of the Federal State of Panama, 1855–1863.

Flag of the Sovereign State of Panama, 1863–1886.

Flag of the United States of Colombia and the current Republic of Colombia, used from November 26, 1861, until November 3, 1903.

Original flag design, according to Manuel E. Amador. It was the first post-independence flag of Panama, during November 1903.

Flag of the Panama Canal Zone (1903–1979), U.S. territory

Current flag of the Republic of Panama: arose from the modification of the first model and began to be used before the oath of December 20, 1903, and ratified among others by Law 64 of 1904.

== Other flags ==
Naval jack of Panama

== Flags of subdivisions ==
=== Provinces ===
Bocas del Toro

Chiriquí

Coclé

Colón

Darién

Herrera

Los Santos

Panamá Oeste

Veraguas

=== Province-level Indigenous Regions ===
Guna Yala

Ngäbe-Buglé

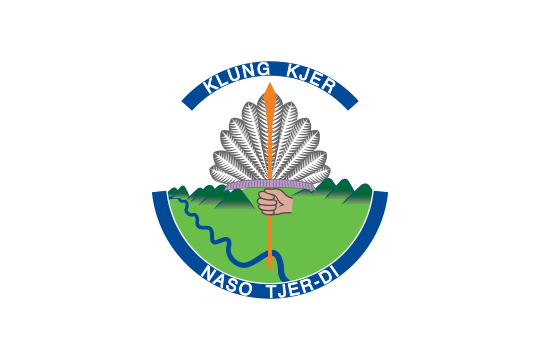
Naso Tjër Di

== See also ==
- List of Panamanian flags
- Coat of arms of Panama
