= Conjunto Multifamiliar Torres Gonzalo Jiménez de Quesada =

Torres Gonzalo Jiménez de Quesada
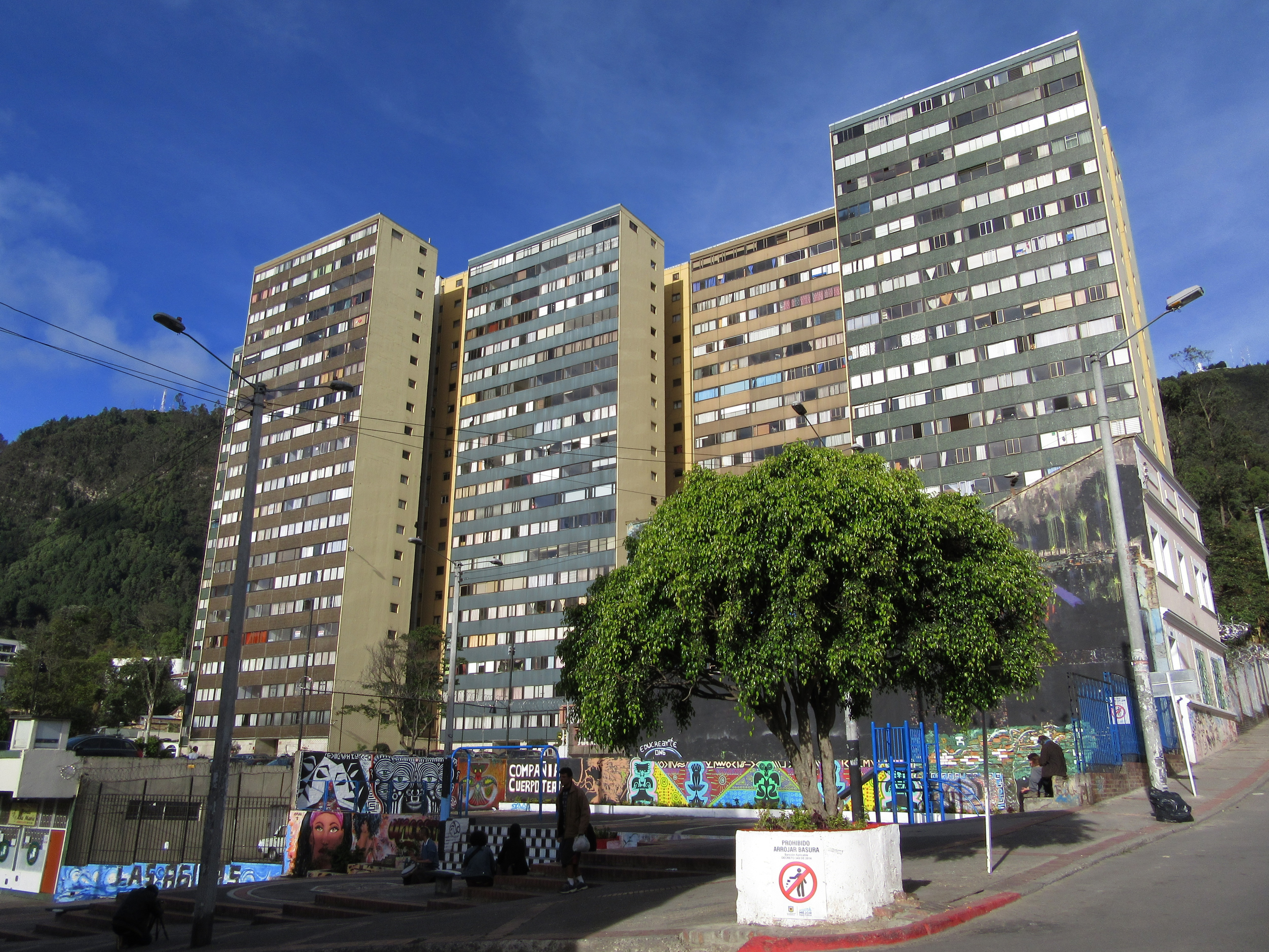
- Torres Gonzalo Jiménez de Quesada

General information
- Type: Residential
- Location: Carrera 2 #16a-38, Bogotá, Colombia
- Coordinates: 4°36′1.16″N 74°04′11.77″W
- Elevation: 2,618 metres (8,589 ft)
- Construction started: 1974
- Completed: 1977

Height
- Architectural: 72 m (236 ft)

Technical details
- Floor count: 21

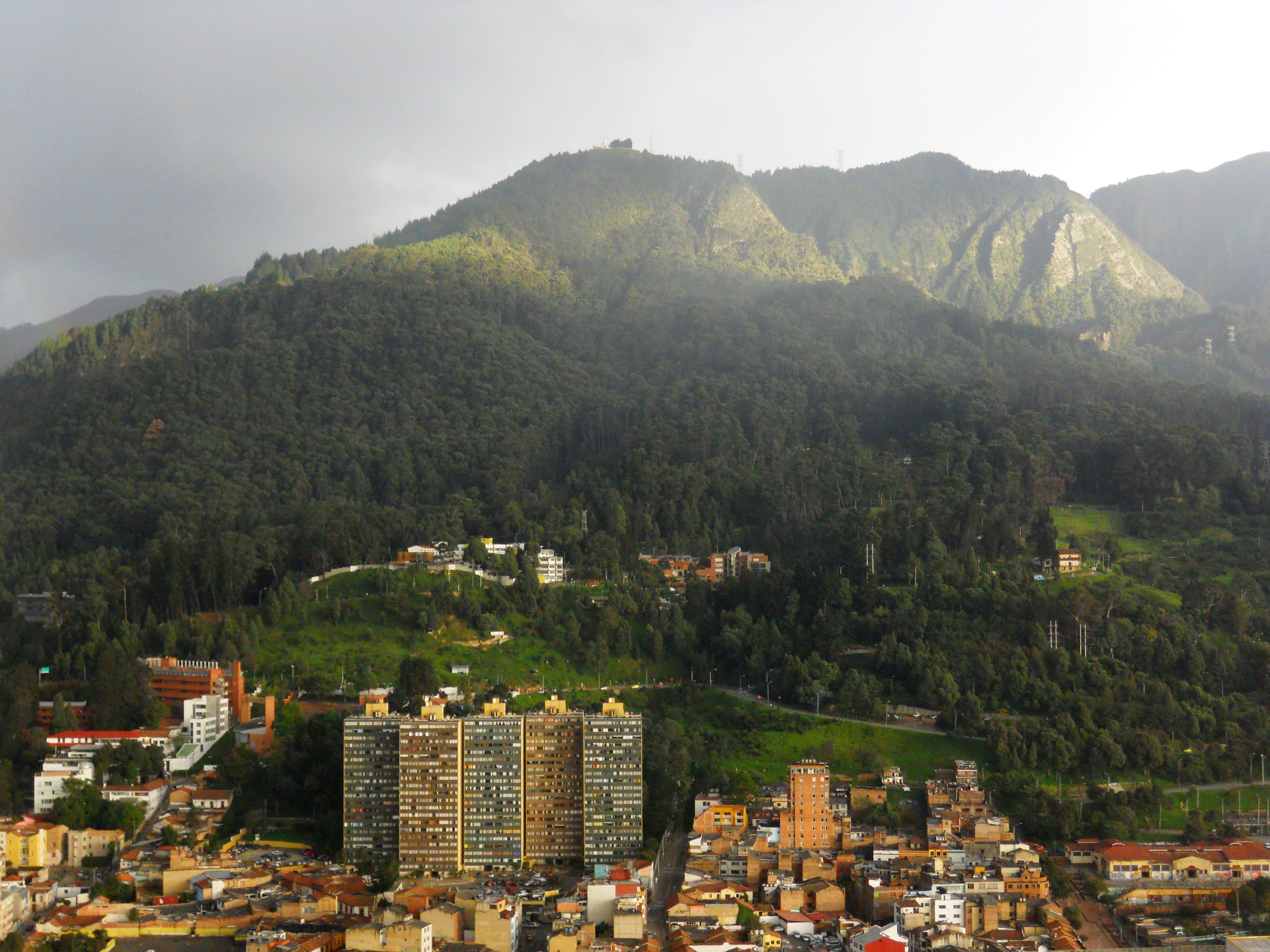
The Torres Gonzalo Jiménez de Quesada with the Cerro de Guadalupe of the Eastern Ranges of the Colombian Andes in the background

The Torres Gonzalo Jiménez de Quesada ("Gonzalo Jiménez de Quesada Towers") is a residential complex composed of five towers of equal height in the centre of the Colombian capital Bogotá. The buildings are situated in the neighbourhood (barrio) Las Aguas, in the northeast of La Candelaria.

== Etymology ==
The towers are named after the Spanish conquistador Gonzalo Jiménez de Quesada, who after the expedition into the Andes and conquest of the Muisca was the first governor of the New Kingdom of Granada and the founder of Bogotá on August 6, 1538.

== Description ==
The Torres Gonzalo Jiménez de Quesada were constructed as part of the urbanization project in the late 1960s and 1970s. They are located in the centre of Bogotá; the locality La Candelaria. The complex of the five residential towers, each 72 metres (236 ft) in height, consists of 390 apartments, next to the Universidad de los Andes. The towers are the highest buildings in the historical centre of the Colombian capital.

At the base of the towers, a mural has been drawn.

== See also ==
- Gonzalo Jiménez de Quesada
- BD Bacatá

== Bibliography ==
- Rincón Avellaneda, Patricia (2006), Bogotá y sus modalidades de ocupación del suelo: análisis de los procesos de re-densificación, Universidad Nacional, pp. 1–229, ISBN 978-958-701-676-5
- Urbina González, Amparo de (2012), "El Centro Histórico de Bogotá "de puertas para adentro": ¿el deterioro del patrimonio al servicio de la gentrificación? - Historic Downtown Bogotá "Behind Closed Doors": Heritage Decay at the Service of Gentrification?" (PDF), Cuadernos de Vivienda y Urbanismo, Universidad Javeriana, 5 (9): 46–69, ISSN 2027-2103
