= Primatial Cathedral of Bogotá =

Roman Catholic cathedral in Bogotá, Colombia

Cathedral Basilica Metropolitan & Primatial of the Immaculate Conception & Saint Peter of Bogotá
- Catedral Basílica Metropolitana y Primada de la Inmaculada Concepción y San Pedro de Bogotá (Spanish)
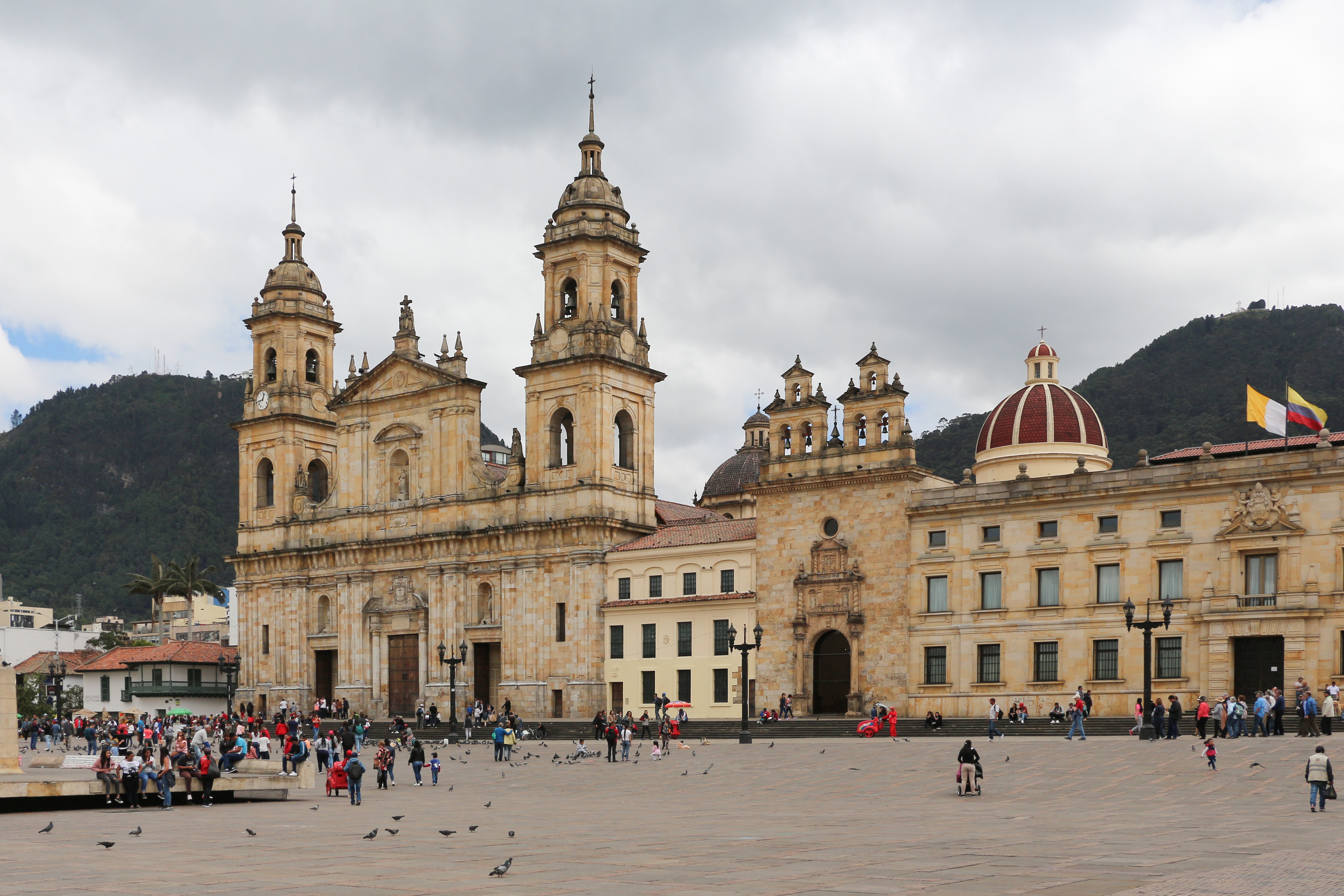
- Bogotá Metropolitan Basilica Cathedral next to Sacred Chapel and Archiepiscopal Palace

Religion
- Affiliation: Catholic Church
- Diocese: Archdiocese of Bogotá
- Ecclesiastical or organisational status: Cathedral, Minor basilica
- Leadership: Archbishop Metropolitan of Bogotá Luis José Rueda Aparicio

Location
- Location: Bogotá, Colombia
- Interactive map of Cathedral Basilica Metropolitan & Primatial of the Immaculate Conception & Saint Peter of Bogotá
- Coordinates: 4°35′53″N 74°04′31″W

Architecture
- Architect: Friar Domingo de Petrés
- Type: Church
- Style: Neoclassical
- Groundbreaking: 1807 (fourth cathedral)
- Completed: 1823

Specifications
- Direction of façade: West
- Height (max): 52

Website
- http://catedral.arquibogota.org.co/es/

The Metropolitan and Primate Cathedral Basilica of the Immaculate Conception and Saint Peter of Bogotá or better known as the Metropolitan Cathedral Basilica of Bogotá and Primate of Colombia, officially Sacred Holy Temple Metropolitan Cathedral Basilica and Primate of the Immaculate Conception of Mary and Saint Peter, is a cathedral church of Catholic worship consecrated to the Immaculate Conception and under the patronage of Saint Peter; it is a Neoclassical style building located in the Plaza de Bolívar in Bogotá, the country's capital.

The cathedral is the seat of the Metropolitan Archbishop of Bogotá and Primate of Colombia, recognized with the honorary title of Primate of Colombia by Pope Leo XIII, through the Decree of the Consistorial Congregation of November 7, 1902. It is also the seat of the Cabildo metropolitano and of the "Parish of the Cathedral Basilica Metropolitana de Bogotá Saint Peter".

The cathedral was designed by Domingo de Petrés and was built between 1807 and 1823 in the same place where three other churches were previously erected, which successively served as cathedrals for the city. Due to its historical significance, architectural and cultural value, it was declared a Monumento Nacional by decree 1,584 of August 11, 1975.

== History ==
The Spanish conquistadors to the Bogotá savanna, the missionary Friar Domingo de las Casas celebrated the first Holy Mass on August 6, 1538, in a modest chapel of mud and straw roofs, and before a banner that rests on the cathedral, in the place where the first stones were laid for the construction of a church. The place was named by the Spanish as Nuestra Señora de la Esperanza.

In 1553, at the initiative of Friar Juan de los Barrios, the decision was made to build a cathedral with mud and brick walls in the same place as the current cathedral, according to the provisions of the Cabildo, for which a public tender was called that assigned the works to Baltasar Díaz and Pedro Vásquez, associated with the bricklayer Juan Rey, with a budget of 1,000 pesos. In 1560, after spending more than 6,000 pesos and on the eve of its inauguration collapsed the roof of the construction. Despite this, on September 11, 1562, Pope Pius IV granted it the title of Cathedral.

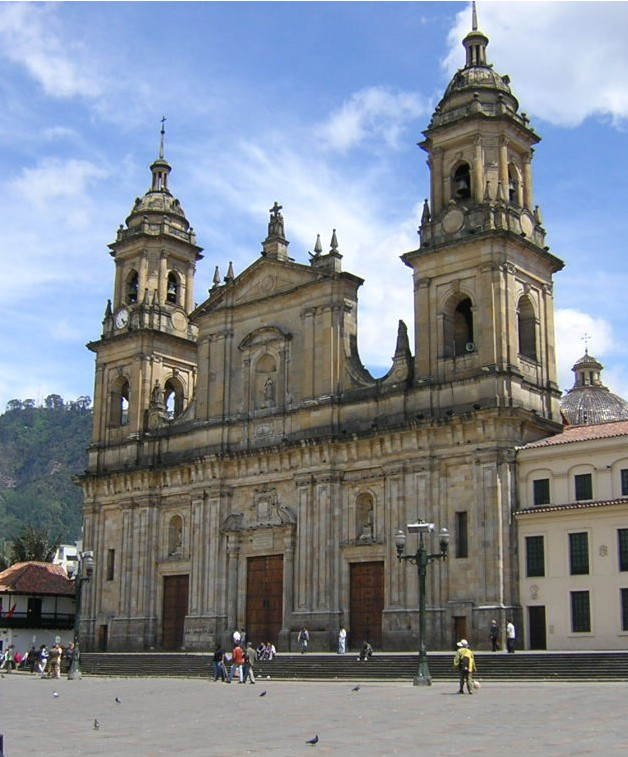
Main facade

Twelve years later, Friar Juan de los Barrios, the first archbishop of the city, brought on his shoulders the first stone for a new cathedral, thus setting an example to all his companions and faithful, who, following him, managed to store a considerable quantity of stones for its construction. The work began on March 12, 1572, in the same place, with the same conditions as the previous one, that is, with three naves, but with an additional detail in which four chapels were added forming a cross.

The work culminated in 1590, with the main chapel covered as well as the arches, but the four side chapels and the three naves were pending in its construction. By 1678 the tower was completed. This new church, the third construction of the cathedral, was notable for the richness of its worship and for its musical chapel. On July 12, 1785, a strong earthquake occurred in the city that seriously affected the construction, for which the decision was made to partially demolish it in 1805.

Some years after the expulsion of the Jesuits from Colombia, it was decided to put the Church of San Ignacio into service as a vice-cathedral, which was called "Vice-cathedral of San Carlos" (in honor of King Charles III) and is located just half a block away from the plaza.

At the beginning of the 19th century by appointment made by Canon Fernando Caycedo y Flórez, Metropolitan Archbishop of Bogotá, the Capuchin friar Friar Domingo de Petrés was appointed as architect for the reconstruction of the cathedral, who was widely influenced by the Neoclassical trend prevailing in that time of history and that determined the style of the reconstruction of the church, Fray Domingo, of Spanish origin, son of a mason, who arrived in Santafé de Bogotá in 1792 to exercise his profession as an architect, beginning the work of the new cathedral on February 11, 1807. He has been considered one of the most representative architects of the new kingdom of Granada, among other works the Astronomical Observatory of Bogotá, the Basilica of Nuestra Señora del Rosario of Chiquinquirá, the Cathedral of Zipaquirá, the Cathedral Basilica of Santa Fe de Antioquia, the Facatativá Cathedral and the Co-Cathedral of Guaduas.

When Friar Domingo died in 1811, the construction of the interior of the cathedral was completed. The remaining works were directed by Nicolás León, who managed to complete them on April 19, 1823. In that same year, the consecration of the cathedral was officiated. The Metropolitan Cathedral Basilica of Bogotá was recognized with the honorary title of Primate of Colombia by Pope Leo XIII, through the Decree of the Consistorial Congregation of November 7, 1902.

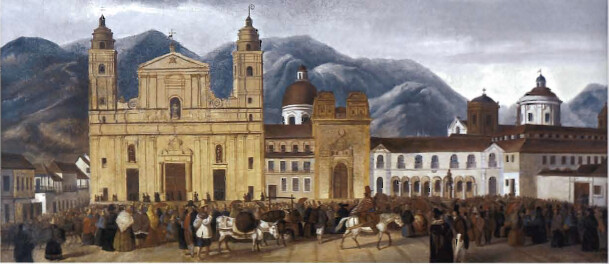
Plaza de Bolívar and cathedral in 1840 by José Santos Figueroa

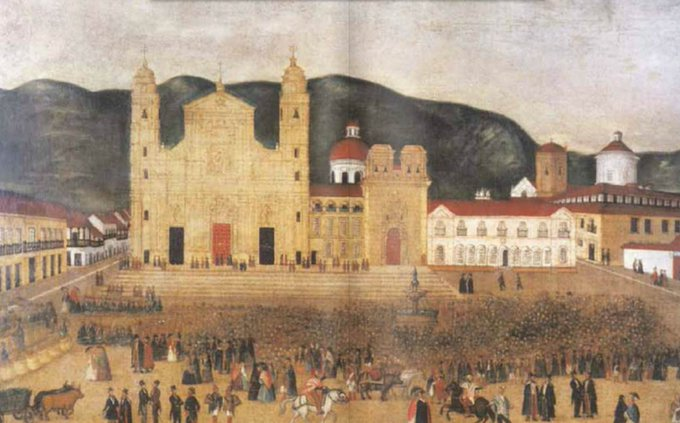
Plaza de Bolívar in 1844, oil by Santiago Castillo Escallón

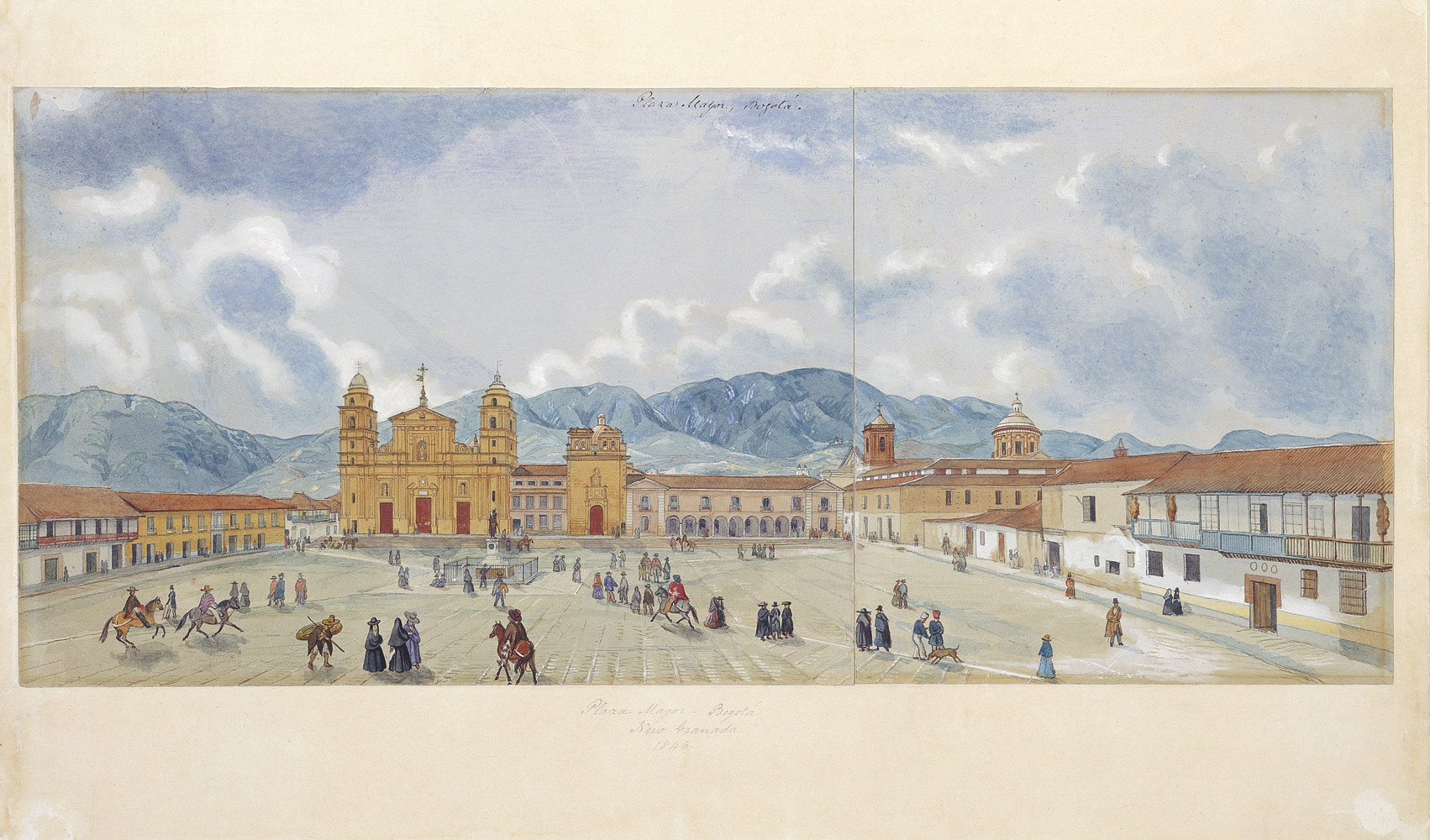
The Plaza de Bolívar in 1846 a watercolor by Edward Mark Walhouse

== Urban context ==
The Metropolitan and Primate Basilica Cathedral occupies the northern part of the eastern block of the Plaza de Bolívar, in the historic center of the city of Bogotá, corresponding to the locality of La Candelaria, whose minor mayor's office was created by the Bogotá City Council through the agreement 7 of December 4, 1974. Its exact location is between Carrera Séptima and Carrera Sexta with Calles 10ª and 11ª, in which the portal is oriented towards the west (on Carrera Séptima, looking towards Plaza de Bolívar) and the side door or false door faces north (on Calle 11th, looking towards the Casa del Florero or Museum of the 20 de julio, place where the Cry of Independence occurred, and surrounding buildings). Its location corresponds to the Episcopal Pastoral Zone of the Immaculate Conception, forming the parish of the Cathedral in the neighborhood of La Candelaria. In the same neighborhood there are four other Catholic churches.

Location of the Metropolitan Cathedral and Primate Basilica in La Candelaria

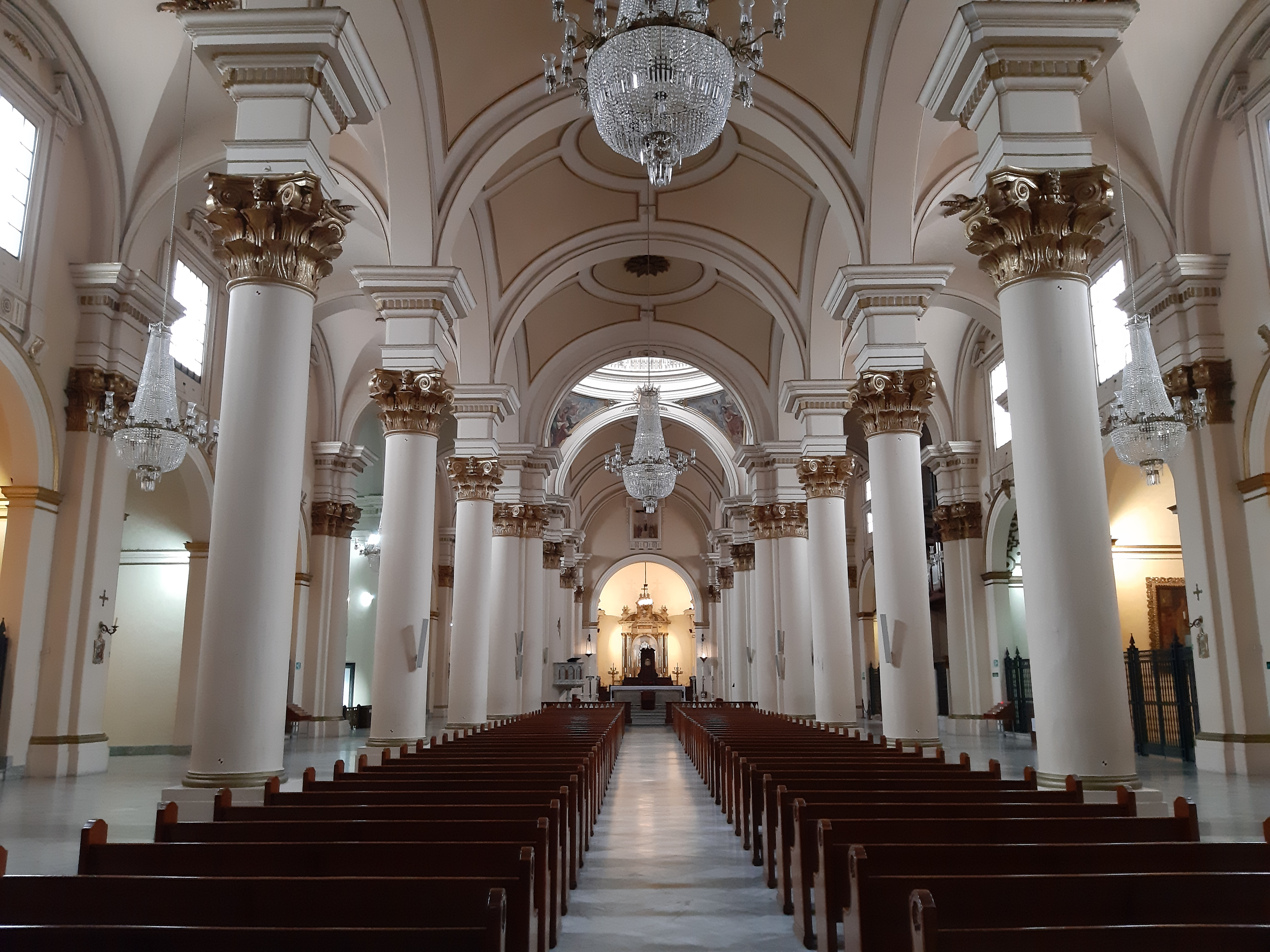
Inside view of the cathedral

On the south side of the cathedral is the Chapel del Sagrario, a church built between 1660 and 1689. Between the Cathedral and the Chapel del Sagrario is the Casa del Cabildo Eclesiástico (also known as the City Hall), which is a three-story building built in 1689 by order of Archbishop Julián Cortázar. Completing the block on the Plaza de Bolívar is the Archbishop's Palace, a building built between 1952 and 1959 to replace the colonial palace, destroyed in April 1948 during the Bogotazo, which was it was located on Calle 11 with Carrera Sexta, next to the Mint House. In the current place of the Archbishop's Palace, the Customs building had been located since 1793, which served as a prison for Viceroy Amar y Borbón after July 20, 1810, and as an office for Viceroy Sámano and Pablo Morillo during the Spanish reconquest.

In the back of the cathedral is the parish house, whose lot was initially destined for the Hospital de San Pedro by order of Archbishop Friar Juan de los Barrios on October 21, 1564. Due to limited space, in 1723 the hospital was moved to the west of the city, on the site currently occupied by the Hospital San Juan de Dios. The current building of the parish house on the corner of calle 11 with carrera 6 dates from 1759 and was declared a national monument through the resolution 191 of March 1, 2005.

The Plaza de Bolívar, as Plaza Mayor of the city, has been the scene of some of the main political and social demonstrations throughout the country's history. Its framework is complemented by the Palace of Justice on the north side, the Palacio Liévano (headquarters of the Mayor's Office of Bogotá) to the west and the Capitolio Nacional to the south. In this way, some of the main institutions that represent the three branches of public power in the country appear in the Square. Since July 20, 1847, in the center of it there is a statue of Simón Bolívar, from whom it officially receives its name, work of the Italian sculptor Pietro Tenerani.

== Description ==
Plan of the Bogotá Cathedral

Arms of the Bogotá Primatial Cathedral as a minor basilica

The cathedral is made up of a Classical basilica plan in the form of a Latin cross that occupies an area of 5,300 square meters, has five naves: the central nave and two side naves of the same height and the other two for the chapels. It also has a main altar and 16 chapels: 8 in the south nave, 8 in the north nave and a frontal one in the central nave, which are complemented by the choir and two sacristies. The lantern and dome are located at the intersection of the transept with the crossing, supported by four pendentives and decorated in the shape of a semicircular dome, with indigo blue and thirteen tongues of fire. The interior paint of the naves and chapels is white, and their vaults have rosettes in the center.

The portal is divided into two bodies. The first is made up of eight Corinthian pilasters that go up to the architrave, frieze and cornice, also of the Doric order; the second body is of the Ionic order and is adorned with eight pilasters. Three sculptures made by Juan de Cabrera adorn the upper part of each door: the north door Saint Peter, the south door Saint Paul and the frontis the Immaculate Conception with two angels on both sides in an attitude of crowning her; Above the latter, the façade is finished off with an isosceles triangle adorned with indentation, Ionic order moldings and above it a pontifical cross with double arms, and below the statue, on the lintel of the main door, a marble slab reads white the inscription: "Under the title and patronage of the Immaculate Conception of Our Lady, religious Santafé will prosper. Year of MDCCCXIV. Architect Friar Domingo de Petrés, Capuchin.". The towers, rebuilt after the earthquake of 1827, measure 52 meters high and start from the main cornice as a bell tower, each one is made up of three bodies with openings on all four sides in the upper body for the bells and in the middle body; the south tower is consecrated to Saint Barbara, while the north tower, consecrated to Saint Emygdius, has a clock. The main door, made in the 16th century, is 7.20 meters high by 3.60 wide, is adorned by two independent pilasters in the form of fluted columns of the Ionic order, whose capitals end in the front cornice, and It features knockers, bolts, studs and fittings in Spanish cast bronze and five salamanders in solvier. The side doors measure 5.60 meters high by 2.80 wide. The atrium is 110 meters long and was built between 1631 and 1664, in 1815 it was extended to the Chapel del Sagrario, in 1842 it was paved and extended to the southern end of the square and in 1913 the corner angle was rounded to facilitate the turn of the tram by the Carrera Séptima.

== Chapels ==
=== Chapel I: Chapel del Baptisterio ===
Upon entering the cathedral and to the right is the south nave, where from west to east, the first thing you see is the Chapel of the Baptistery with the baptismal font, a carved stone font from the 18th century, and behind it, the painting "Baptism of Christ", oil on canvas painted by the artist Ricardo Acevedo Bernal in 1898. On the western side of the chapel is the painting "Jesus Child and the Eternal Father", oil on canvas by the artist Pedro Figueroa.

=== Chapel II: Chapel of San Pedro ===
Continuing east along the south nave, we find the Chapel de San José, which contains a masonry altar of composite order, designed by Petrés. In this altar we find a carved wooden image, from the Sevillian School of the 17th century. On the eastern side of the chapel is the oil on canvas "Jesus with the Cross on His Back". To the west of the chapel is the painting "Our Lady of Sorrows", oil on canvas from the 17th century and by an anonymous author, Saint Peter bears the second title of the Metropolitan Basilica Cathedral.

=== Chapel del Sagrario ===
From the Metropolitan and Primate Basilica Cathedral we can access the Chapel del Sagrario.

=== Chapel III: Chapel of Nuestra Señora del Carmen ===
Carved and polychrome wooden sculpture from the 20th century. On the eastern side of the chapel we find the painting "Saint Teresa of Jesus", oil on canvas from the 17th century and by an anonymous author. On the western side we find the painting "Appearance of Our Lady to San Simón Stock", oil on canvas from the 17th century and by an anonymous author.

=== Chapel IV: Chapel of Santa Isabel de Hungría ===
Saint Elizabeth of Hungary is the patroness saint of the Archdiocese of Bogotá. Previously known as the chapel of Saint Ursula and later as Saint Catherine of Siena. At the bottom of the chapel is the painting "Saint Elizabeth of Hungary", oil on canvas by the Spaniard Domínguez (copy of a painting by the Spaniard Esteban Murillo).

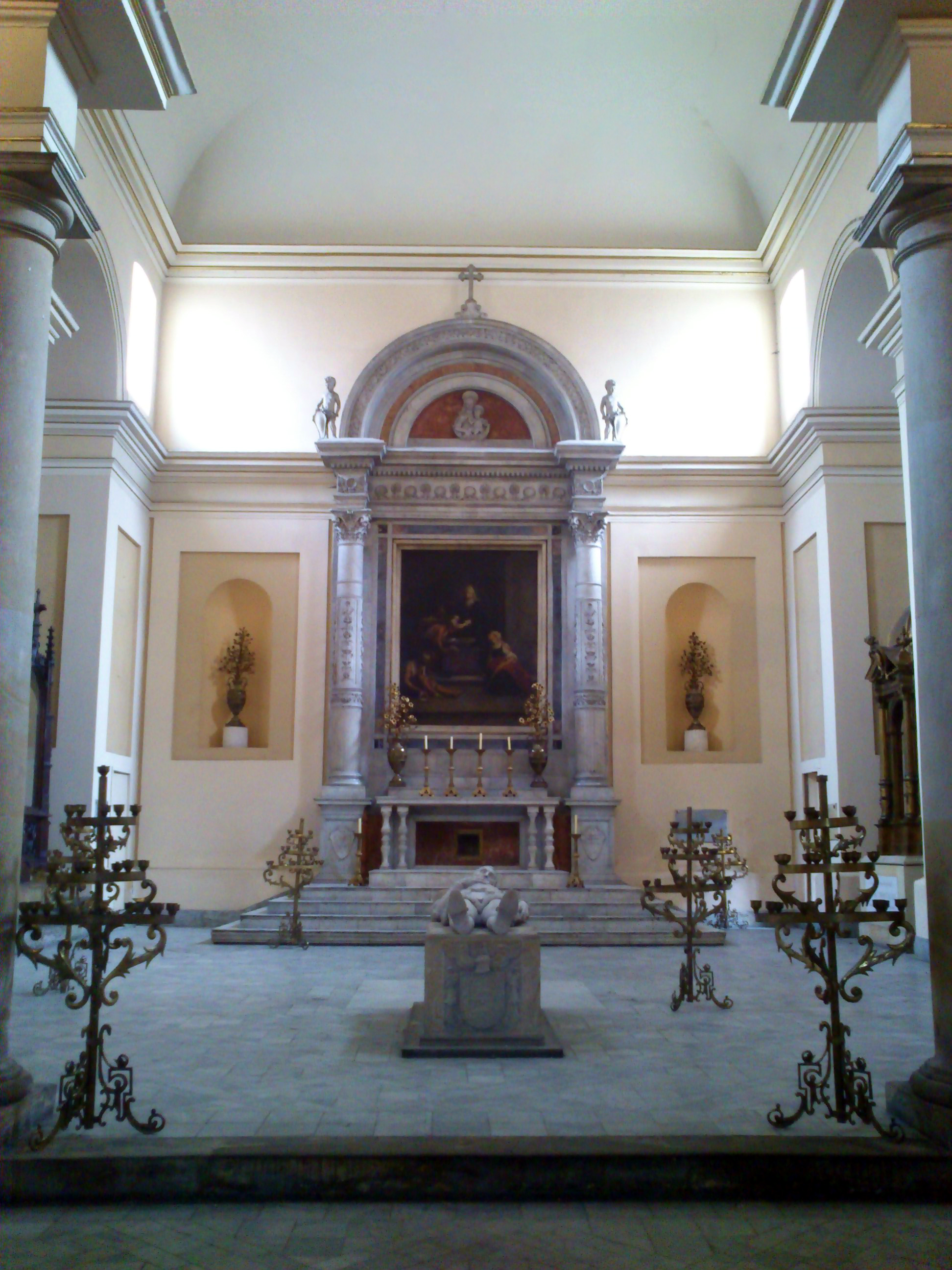
Chapel of Saint Elizabeth of Hungary, in the foreground you can see the sarcophagus of Gonzalo Jiménez de Quesada, founder of the city

In this chapel stands out the tomb of the Spanish conquistador and founder of the city Gonzalo Jiménez de Quesada, sculpted by the artist Luis Alberto Acuña on a white marble altar by Cassioli; On the eastern wall, the bust of General Antonio Nariño stands out in the place where his remains lie. Three apses in front of the chapel's colonnade contain the monuments of the city's archbishops, in order that of Vicente Arbeláez in Renaissance style, that of Manuel José Mosquera in wood and Gothic style, and that of José Telésforo Paul in Florentine Gothic style. On the western wall, a marble monument contains the ashes of the Venezuelan Pedro Gual and a plaque commemorates Archbishop Fernando Caicedo y Flores, complemented by a picture of the Creed of Santiago and the statue of Mary Immaculate, which was on the main altar for three centuries. Four columns rest on the step, which contain the remains of Archbishops Aquinao Camacho, del Pórtico and Torres and a few steps to the south is Monsignor Juan Bautista Agnozzi, delegate of the Holy See who visited the city in 1882.

=== Chapel V: Chapel of Santiago Apóstol ===
It is made up of an Ionic altar with the colonial painting "Saint James Apostle in the Battle of Clavijo", oil on canvas by Gregorio Vásquez de Arce y Ceballos.

The painter Gregorio Vásquez de Arce y Ceballos (1638–1711), author of all the paintings in this chapel, is buried in this place.

=== Chapel VI: Chapel of Nuestra Señora del Topo ===
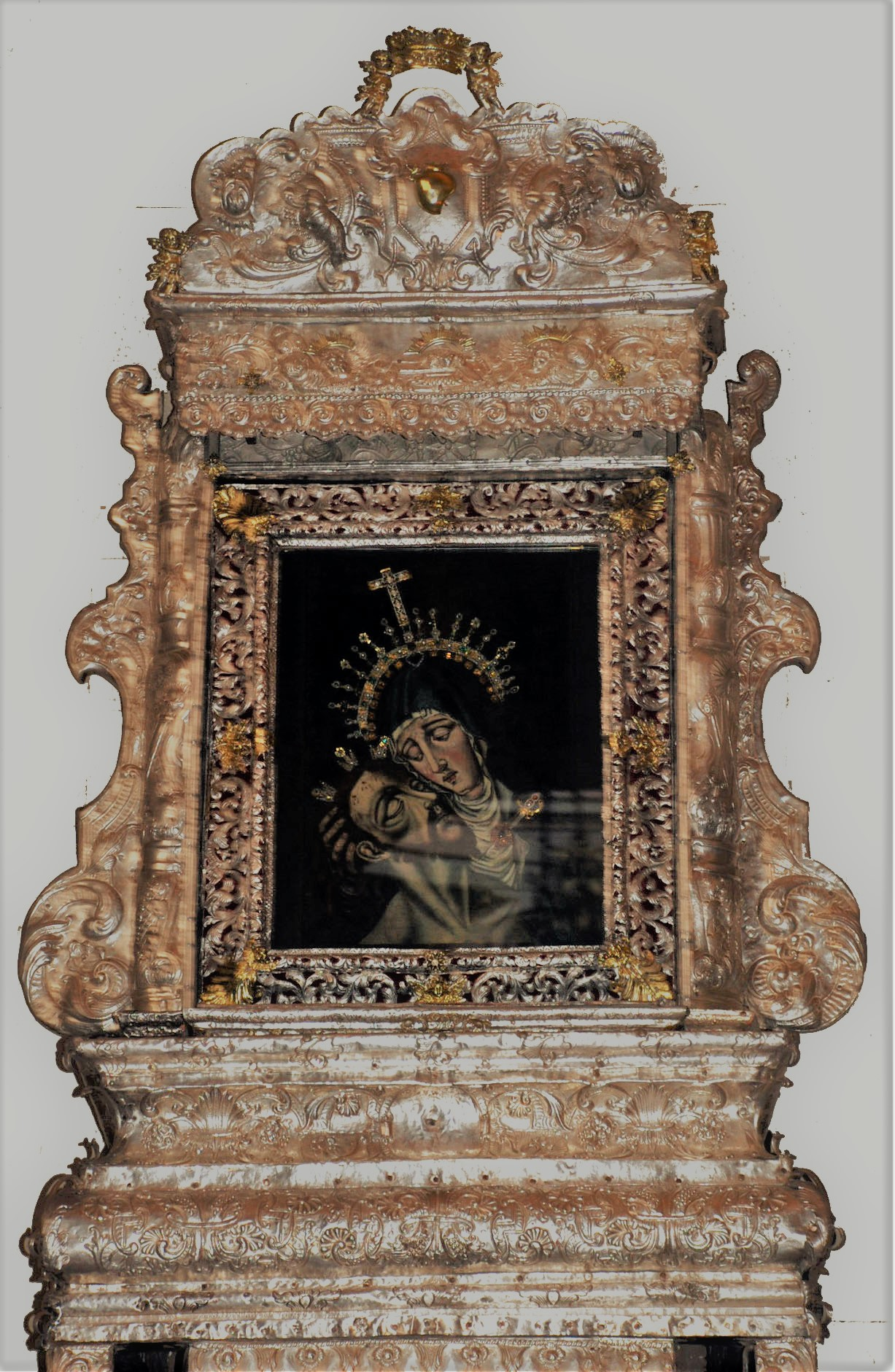
The Our Lady of El Topo, Colombian Marian invocation, an oil painting attributed to the painting school of Luis de Morales “El Divino” in the 16th century. This painting has been venerated in the Cathedral of Bogotá since 1610

Behind the main altar is the Chapel of Our Lady of El Topo, a historical and religious relic where the choir stalls of the canons are located. It measures 29 meters long by 14 wide, it has a semicircular arch entrance supported by two pilasters and closed by an iron gate. The central altar is from the 18th century, of the Doric order embossed in silver and also has two altars on the side walls. The main altarpiece is dated 1610 by an unknown author, represents the invocation of Our Lady of Sorrows of El Topo, patroness saint of the canons of Bogotá, in which the virgin appears leaning over the head of the dead Jesus. On her sides are an image of Saint Joseph and an image of Saint Francis. In this chapel are the remains of Aurelio París Sanz de Santamaría.

=== Chapel VII: Chapel of Nuestra Señora de los Dolores ===
Made in 1906 and contains an Ionic altar and three niches: the left one with the Magdalena, the central one with Our Lady and the right one with Saint John the Evangelist, where the tomb of Juan Martín de Sarratea, superintendent of the Mint House, is located, and finally there is a door that communicates with the Sacristy of the Chaplains of the Choir and above it there is a painting of the Sepulcher of the Lord.

=== Chapel VIII: Chapel of San Juan Nepomuceno ===
Formerly called the Chapel of the Virgin of Perpetual Help (also called the Holy Trinity), today it is known as the Chapel of John of Nepomuk, and was built in 1630.

It has a Doric altar surrounded by a grille, a statue of Our Lady in a niche and four lateral paintings. It has a painting of Saint Francis Borgia, the work of Gregorio Vásquez de Arce y Ceballos.

=== Chapel IX: Chapel of la Inmaculada Concepción ===
This chapel is adorned with a half-round arch and a masonry altar. It contains a statue of the Immaculate Conception, patroness saint of the city of Bogotá, bearing the first title of the Bogotá Metropolitan Cathedral Basilica, installed in the central niche in 1904, and a statue over the tomb of Archbishop Bernardo Herrera Restrepo on the western wall, a work by the artist Gustavo Arcila Uribe.

=== Chapel X: Chapel of San José ===
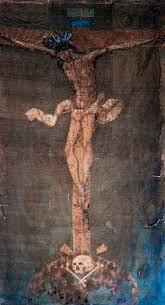
Christ of the Conquest, painted in 1538, housed in the sacristy of the Cathedral of Bogotá

This chapel, before being dedicated to Saint Joseph, was called the Chapel of Nuestra Señora de las Mercedes, and it is the oldest chapel (built in 1590). It was originally the chapel of Saint Anne because of the painting by Gaspar Figueroa and it contains an Ionic altar, a Quitoan statue of Virgin of Mercy in the central niche and the tomb of Eulogio Tamayo (treasurer and dean of the cathedral in 1887, who during the Concordat, requested the legal status of the Congregation of the Sacred Hearts).

=== "False" door ===
After the Chapel of San José is the side entrance of the church or "false door", which has on its outside a coat of arms of Spain carved in stone and on the inside two ancient Italian style paintings.

=== Chapel XI: Chapel of las Ánimas ===
The second chapel of this nave is dedicated to the Holy Christ (also known as the souls in purgatory), it contains an altar of order composed of a small grille, a picture of the Crucified Christ, two small pictures on the right side and a painting of the Salvador de Vásquez.

=== Chapel XII: Chapel of the Sagrado Corazón de Jesús ===
The north aisle has on the western side the Chapel of the Sacred Heart of Jesus, which has a golden Doric altar and a marble statue of Christ, the work of the Pussilque Russaud House in Paris and marble inscriptions on the laws of 1913 as a tribute to Jesus Christ and from 1919 as a tribute to Our Lady.

== Pipe organ ==
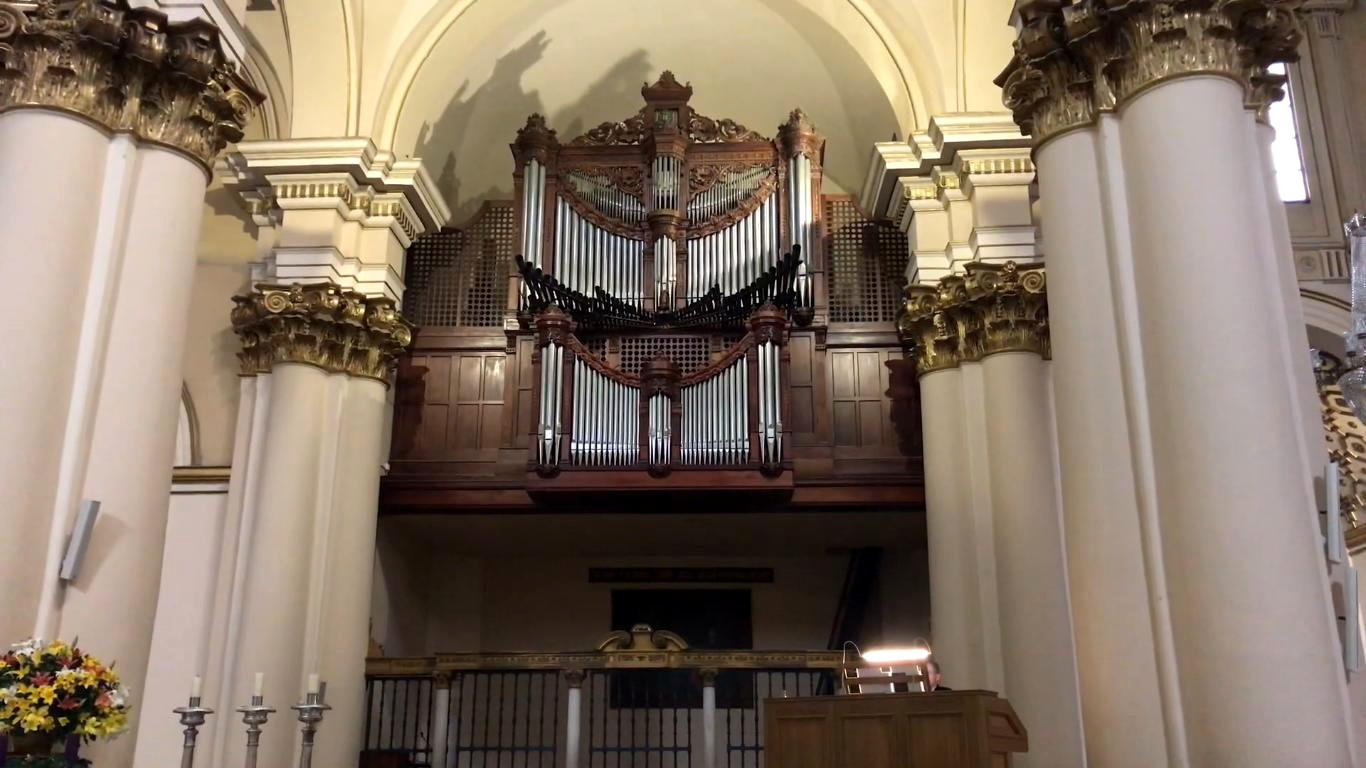
The pipe organ

The pipe organ of the cathedral was originally an instrument by Aquilino Amezua, a prominent Spanish organ builder, his system consists of 58 organ stops, a console with four manual keyboards and a keyboard that is played with the feet (pedalboard); it has around 4,500 pipes, which makes it the largest organ in Colombia.

The instrument underwent a restoration costing 2,515 million pesos, which was financed by the Colombian Ministry of Culture, the National Tourism Fund (Fontur) and the Archdiocese of Bogotá. The restoration was carried out between 2013 and 2016 and was entrusted to the Spanish organ company Gerhard Grenzing S.A., which has also intervened on the organs of the cathedrals of Seville, Brussels and Mexico, among others. Finally, the inauguration of the organ took place on July 2, 2016, with the Blessing of the instrument by Cardinal Rubén Salazar Gómez and an inaugural concert presided over by the Spanish maestro Juan de la Rubia, titular organist of the Sagrada Família in Barcelona (Spain).

== Other burials ==
- Aníbal Muñoz Duque
- Aurelio París Sanz de Santamaría
- Julián de Cortázar
- Policarpa Salavarrieta (cenotaph)

== Geography and Parish boundaries ==
- North: Church of La Veracruz and Church of Nuestra Señora de Las Aguas
- South: Nuestra Señora de Belén and Santa Bárbara Parishes (Center)
- East: Church of Nuestra Señora de Egipto
- West: Church of La Capuchina.

== See also ==
- List of tallest structures built before the 20th century
