= Cathedral Basilica of Santa Fe de Antioquia =

Cathedral Basilica of the Immaculate Conception
- Catedral Basílica de la Inmaculada Concepción de Santa Fe de Antioquia
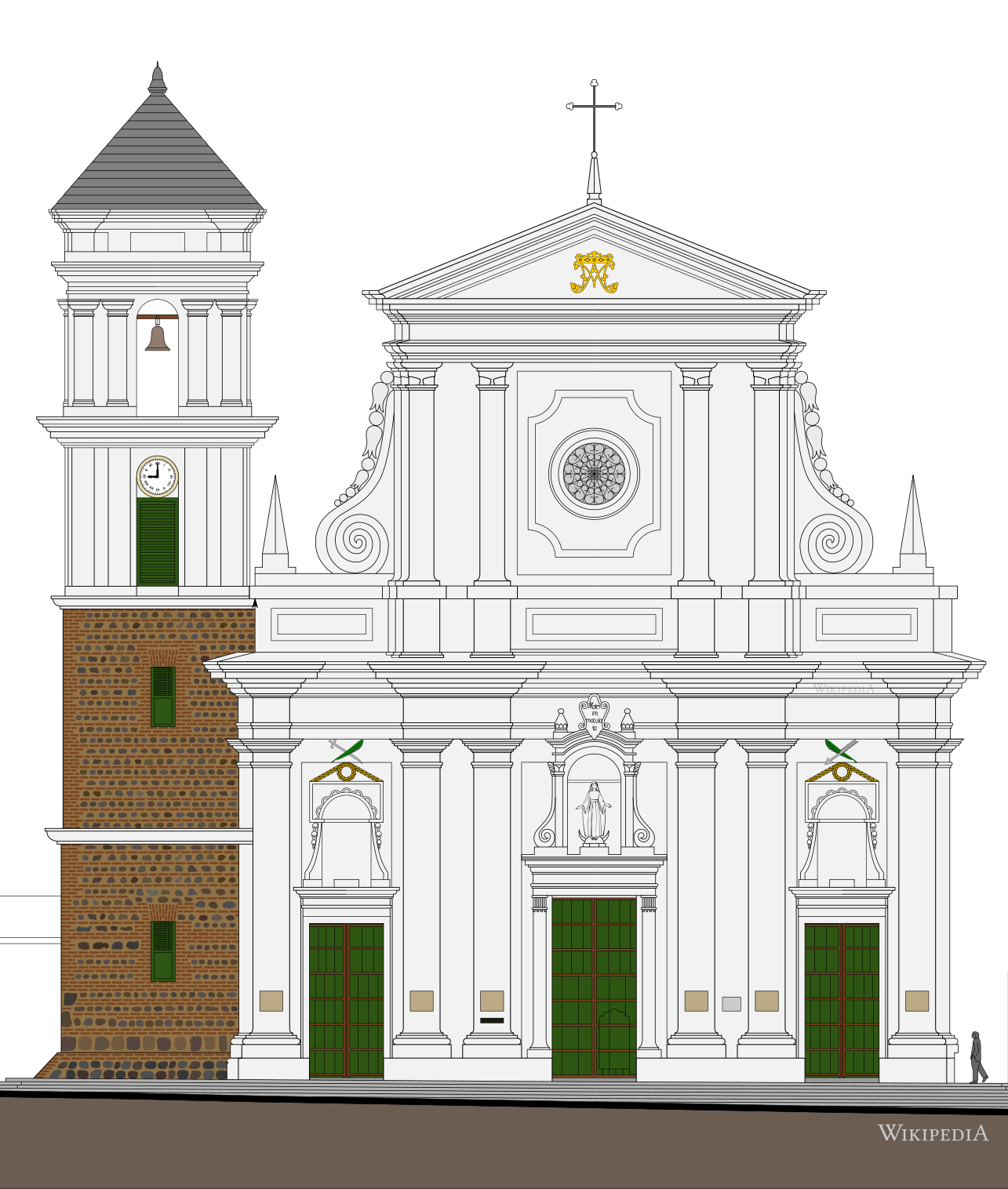
- Cathedral Basilica of the Immaculate Conception
- 6.557°N 75.82747°W
- Location: Santa Fe de Antioquia
- Country: Colombia
- Denomination: Roman Catholic Church

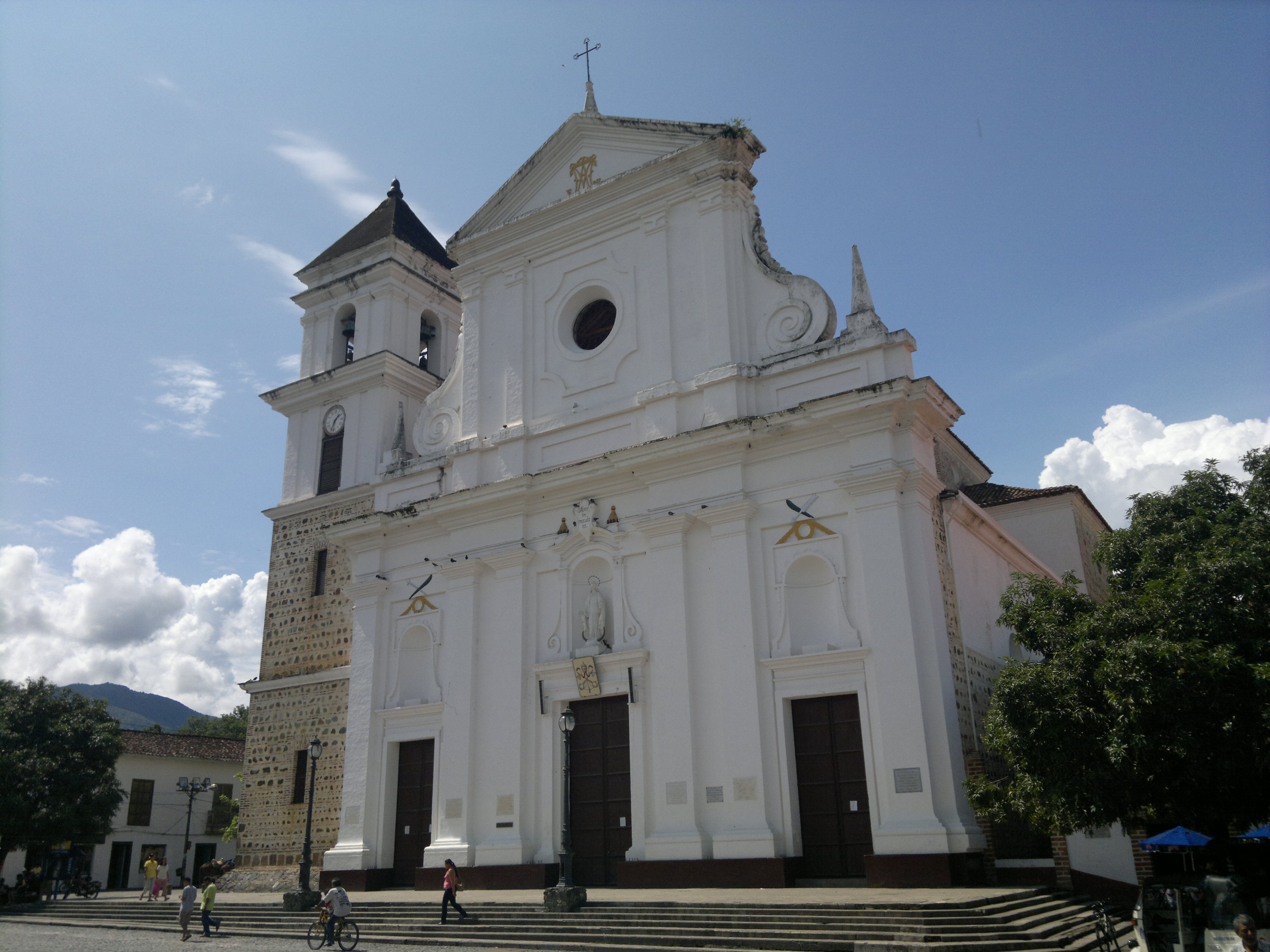

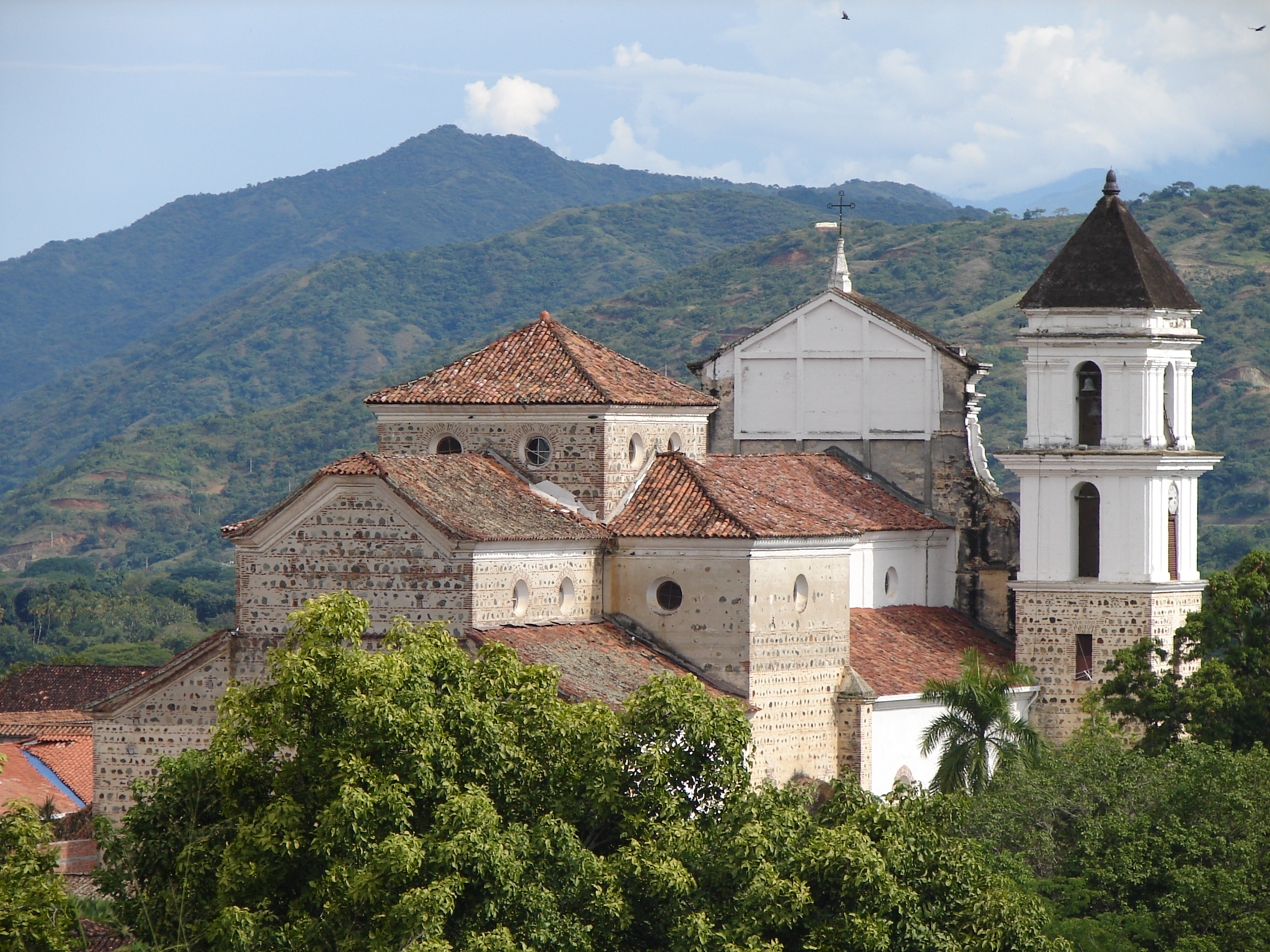
Exterior view

The Cathedral Basilica of the Immaculate Conception (Spanish: Catedral Basílica de la Inmaculada Concepción de Santa Fe de Antioquia) also called Santa Fe de Antioquia Cathedral It is a cathedral church of Catholic worship dedicated to the Virgin Mary under the title of the Immaculate Conception. The building is located on the northeastern side of the main square of the town and city of Santa Fe de Antioquia (Antioquia) in the South American country of Colombia. The cathedral is the principal church of the Roman Catholic Archdiocese of Santa Fe de Antioquia, seat of the Archbishop and Metropolitan Chapter.

== Description ==
Designed by Fray Domingo de Petres, who also designed the Cathedral of Bogota, style can be located within the neoclassical, with details of popular baroque; It has a single tower measuring 47 meters high, is rectangular and its interior is of three ships with semicircular arches on Tuscan columns. Colonial valuable artistic works housed inside stand out.

The historical sector (including the cathedral) of Santa Fe de Antioquia, the old capital of the department of Antioquia, was declared a National Monument of Colombia by Law 163 of December 30, 1959.

== See also ==
- Roman Catholicism in Colombia
- Cathedral Basilica of the Immaculate Conception
