= La Candelaria, Bogotá =

La Candelaria
- Locality of Bogotá
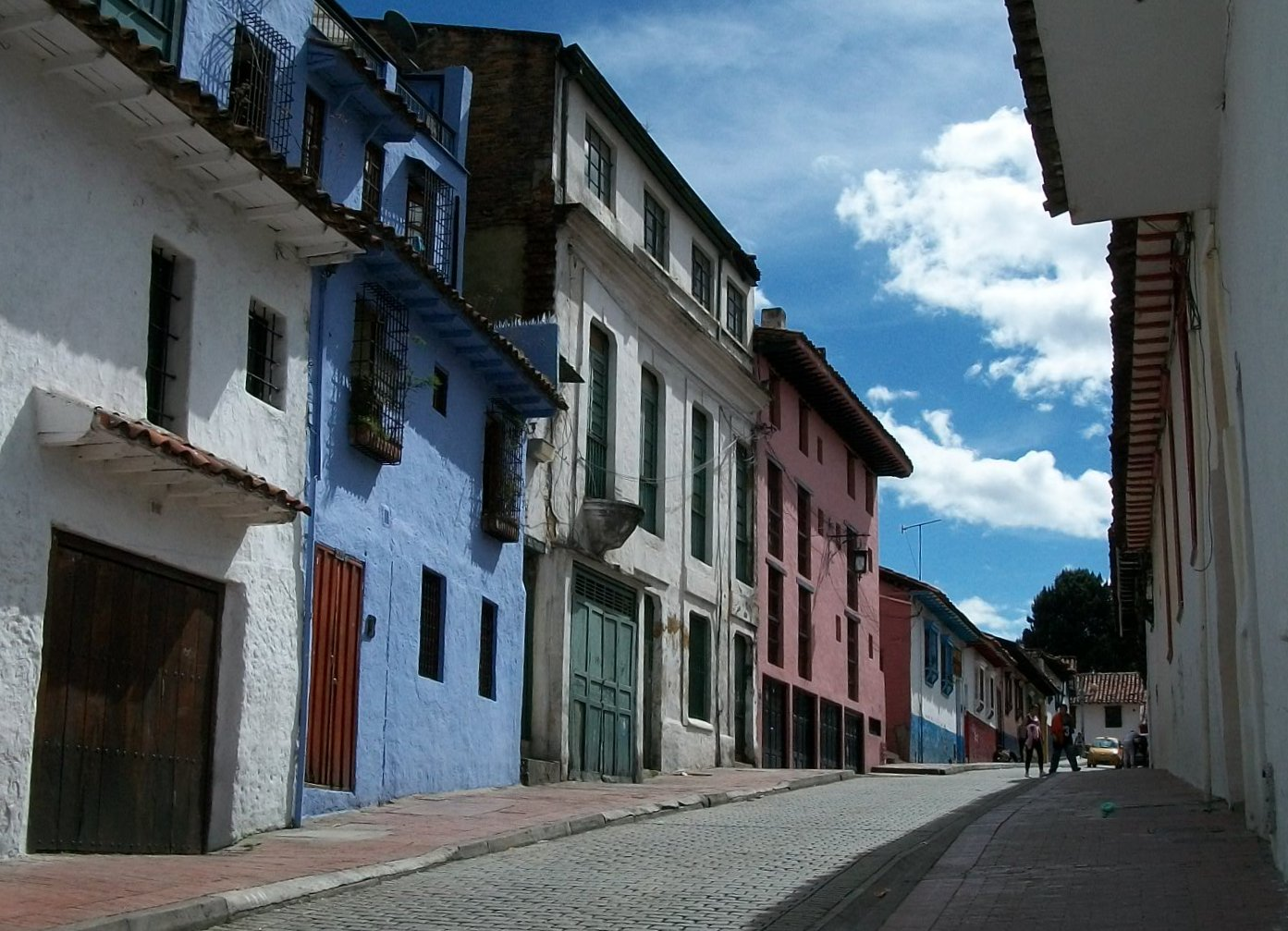

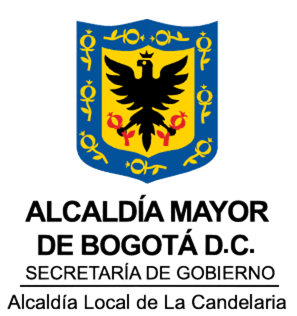
- Coat of arms

- Location of the locality in the city of Bogotá

- Location of the locality in the Capital District of Bogotá
- Coordinates: 4°35′30″N 74°04′27″W
- Country: Colombia
- City: Bogotá D.C.

Area
  - Total: 2.06 km^{2} (0.80 sq mi)
- Elevation: 2,600 m (8,500 ft)

Population (2007)
  - Total: 22,115
  - Density: 10,700/km^{2} (27,800/sq mi)
- Time zone: UTC-5 (Colombia Standard Time)
- Website: Official website

La Candelaria is the 17th locality of Bogotá, Colombia. It is a historic neighborhood located in the city's downtown area, similar to the Old City in other cities. The architecture in La Candelaria features Spanish Colonial, Baroque, and art deco styles. The locality is home to several universities, libraries, and museums.

La Candelaria encompasses the neighborhoods of La Catedral, La Concordia, Las Aguas, Centro Administrativo, Egipto, Belén, San Francisco Rural, Nueva Santa Fe and Santa Bárbara. The area was the site of the Bogotá's founding on August 6, 1538, and it includes the historic center of Bogotá. Today, it serves as an important tourist, educational, and commercial hub.

== History ==
Teusaquillo (now known as Chorro de Quevedo) was a resting place for the Muisca ruler, the Zipa. It is believed that Gonzalo Jiménez de Quesada founded what would become Bogotá, on August 6, 1538, at this location. The town was named after the colonial Church of Nuestra Señora de la Candelaria.

In April 1539, the formal foundation was established in the current Plaza de Bolívar. The original city layout included the Plaza Mayor and the site of the Parish of San Pedro, which later became the Metropolitan Basilica Cathedral of Bogotá and Primate of Colombia.

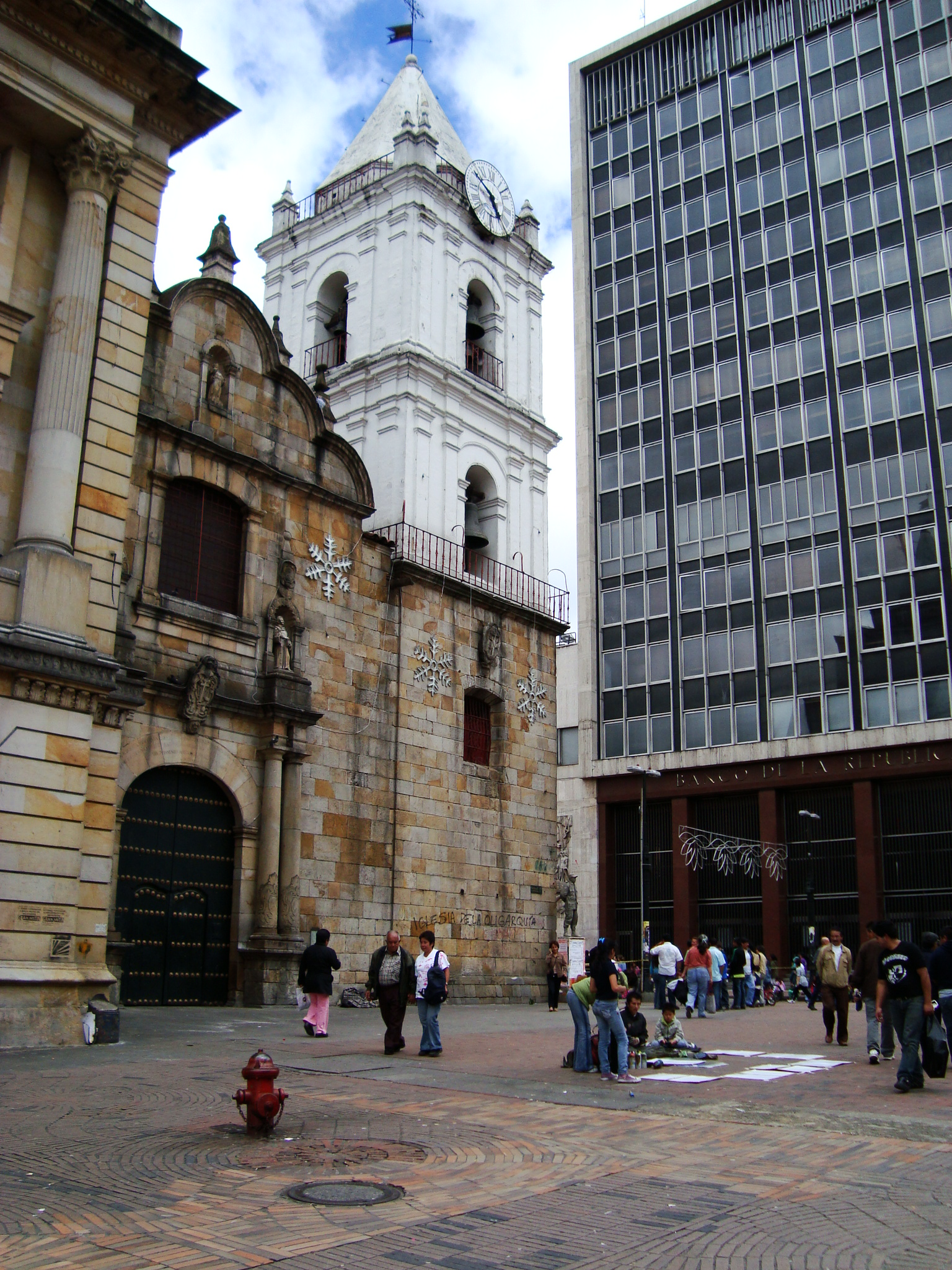
Church of San Francisco

The city expanded to the north (Plaza de las Hierbas), south (Las Cruces) and west (San Victorino), with the Plaza Mayor and the Cathedral remaining the traditional center and seat of colonial and later republican powers. During the 18th and 19th centuries, the city was divided into four parishes: San Pedro, Nuestra Señora de las Nieves, San Victorino and Santa Bárbara. The Parish of San Pedro included the area of the current locality of La Candelaria, which was composed of the neighborhoods of el Príncipe, San Jorge, El Palacio and La Catedral.

When the Special District of Bogotá was created in 1955, there was no significant distinction between the central area of Bogotá and the historic center. In the 1970s, the La Candelaria corporation was established to preserve the historical heritage of the neighborhoods of La Catedral, La Concordia and La Candelaria.

Through Agreement 7 of December 4, 1974, the Council of Bogotá established the Minor Mayor's Office of La Candelaria. This led to its recognition in 1991 as one of the 20 localities of the Capital District of Bogotá, with the first Local Administrative Board (JAL) elected.

== Attractions ==
In La Candelaria is the site of the formal foundation of the city, the Plaza Mayor known today as Plaza de Bolívar. Around it are the Capitolio Nacional (seat of the Congress of Colombia), the Palace of Justice (seat of the Supreme Court of Justice), the Palacio Liévano (seat of the Mayor's Office of Bogotá), the Primatial Cathedral of Bogotá, the Chapel del Sagrario and the Archbishop's Palace (seat of the Archbishop "Cardinal seat").

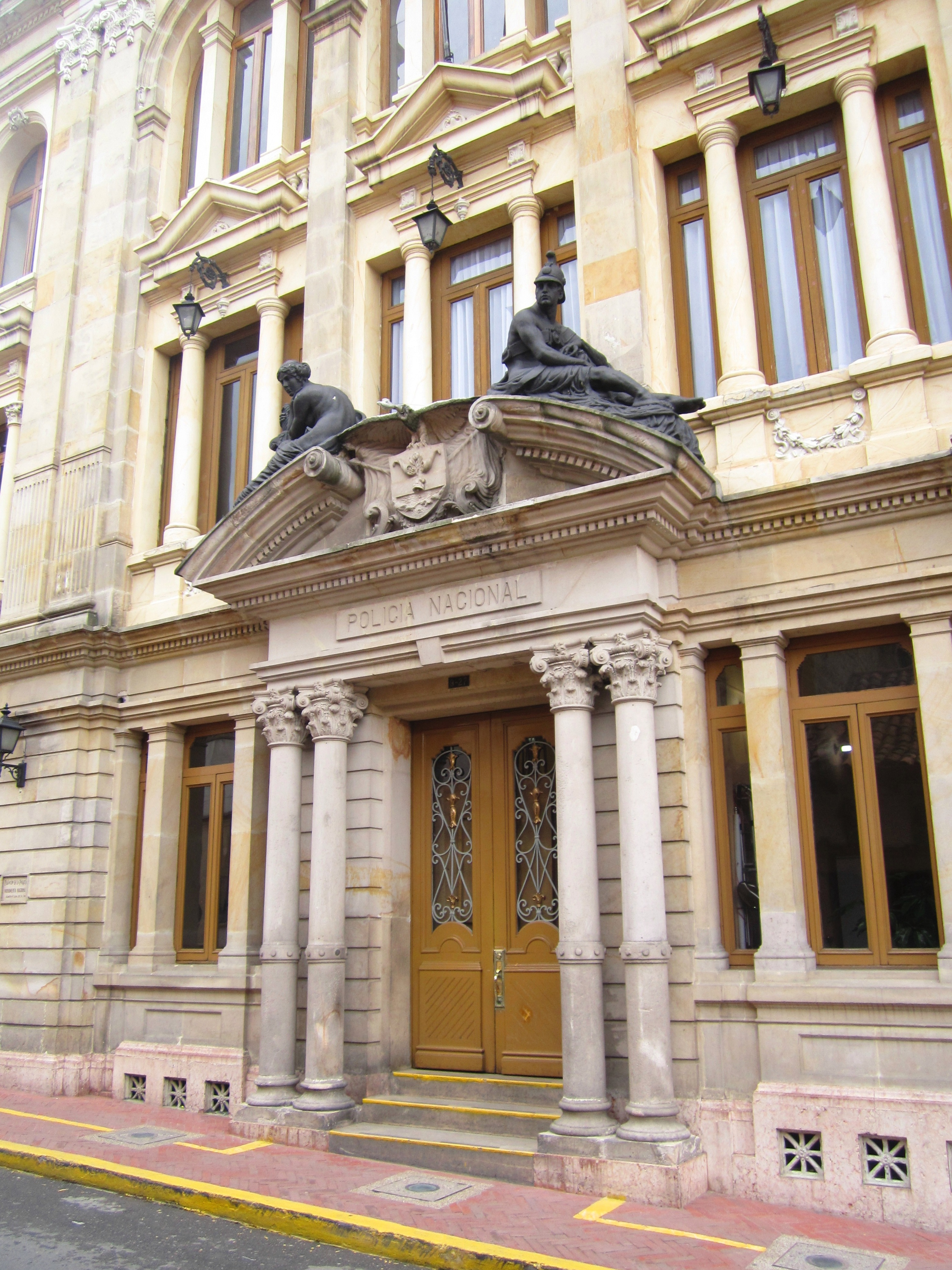
Museum of the Police

In addition to the Capitolio and the Palace of Justice, other important seats of national power located in the place are the Casa de Nariño (seat of the Presidency of the Republic and presidential residence), and the Palacio de San Carlos (seat of the Chancellery or Ministry of International Relations).

Among the museums, the Museums and Collections of the Bank of the Republic (Mint House, Museo Botero and Art Museum of the Bank of the Republic), Casa del Florero, the Museum of Colonial Art, the Archaeological Museum House of the Marquis of San Jorge, the Military Museum, the Regional Costume Museum (Manuelita Sáenz's house), the Museo de Bogotá, the National Police Museum.

Among the cultural centers are the Luis Ángel Arango Library, which in addition to having reading rooms, offers daily conferences that cover all sciences, as well as being the site of important art exhibitions. There is also the Gabriel García Márquez Cultural Center, the Gilberto Alzate Avendaño Foundation and the birthplace of Rafael Pombo.

Among its churches, parishes, rectories and sanctuaries, it is worth mentioning the Primatial Cathedral of Bogotá, the Chapel del Sagrario, the Santa Clara Church Museum, the National Sanctuary of Nuestra Señora del Carmen, the San Ignacio Church, the Church of San Agustín, the Ermita del San Miguel del Príncipe, the Parish of Nuestra Señora de Belén, the Church of Nuestra Señora de Las Aguas, the Church of Nuestra Señora de la Candelaria and the Church of Santa Bárbara.

Several universities have their headquarters in this town, among which Los Andes, La Salle, Del Rosario, la Gran Colombia, Externado, Free University, the Autonomous, America, the Central, National Unified Corporation for Higher Education, Jorge Tadeo Lozano University, Francisco José de Caldas District University and the Colegio Mayor de San Bartolomé stand out.

Other sites of interest include:

- Calle del Embudo - The narrow, cobblestoned street gets its name from its shape. Embudo translates to "funnel" in English; the street is shaped like a funnel. It is one of the most colourful streets in the historic La Candelaria district and leads to the Plaza del Chorro de Quevedo. Many walls on Calle del Embudo are painted with street art or graffiti, in the bright colours of Colombia. Some of them depict legends from the pre-Columbian era.
- Plaza del Chorro de Quevedo - It is believed that the Spanish conquistador Gonzalo Jiménez de Quesada established the capital city of Bogotá on this square on August 6, 1538. The square takes its name from an Augustinian priest, Friar Quevedo, who in 1832 purchased the site and set up the public water fountain in the centre. Its water supply was cut off when a nearby building collapsed in 1896. It is also believed that it was from this site that the zipa, the main cacique of the Muisca, viewed the Bogotá savanna. Today, with all the buildings that surround the square, no such view is available.

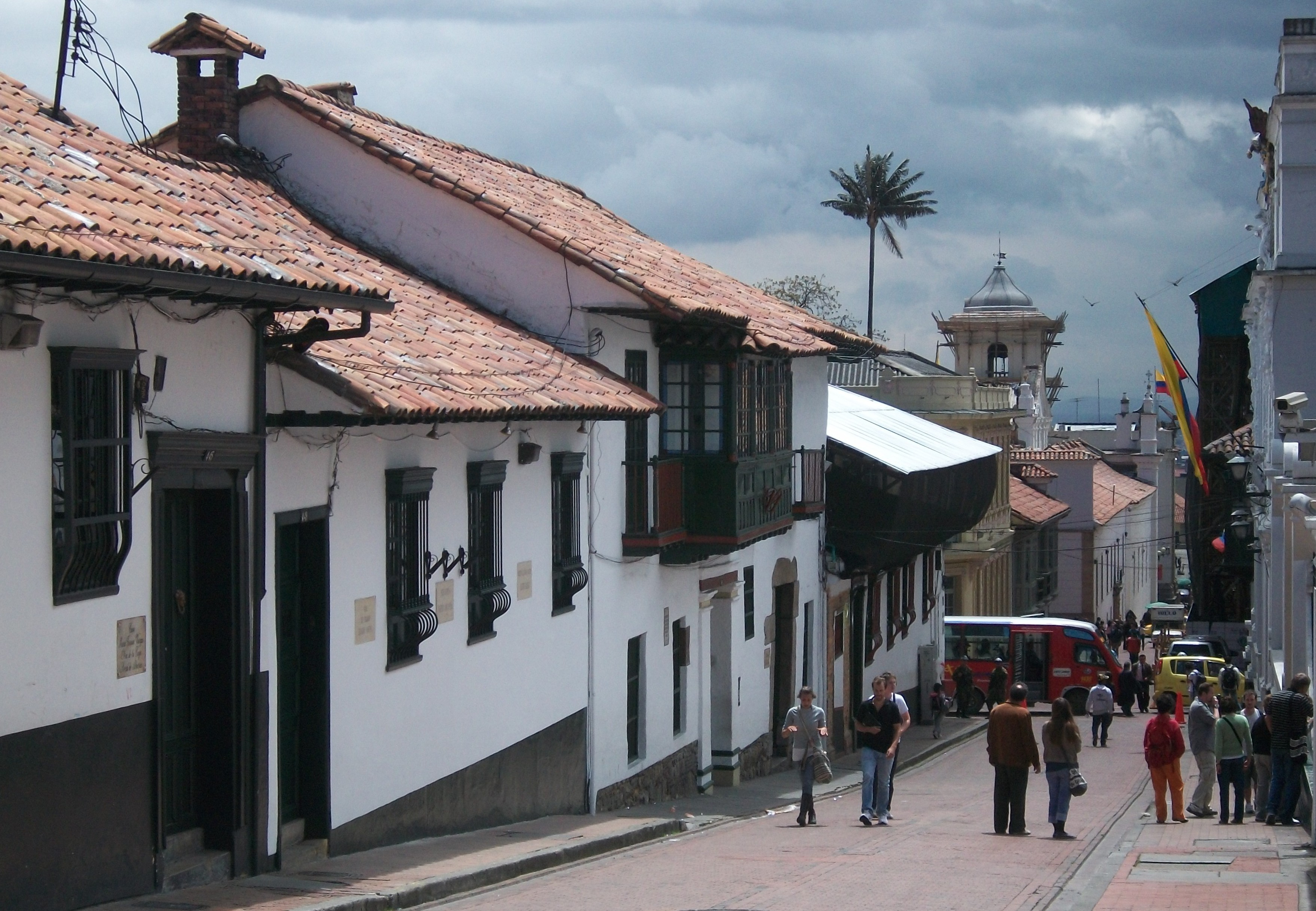
Street of La Candelaria.

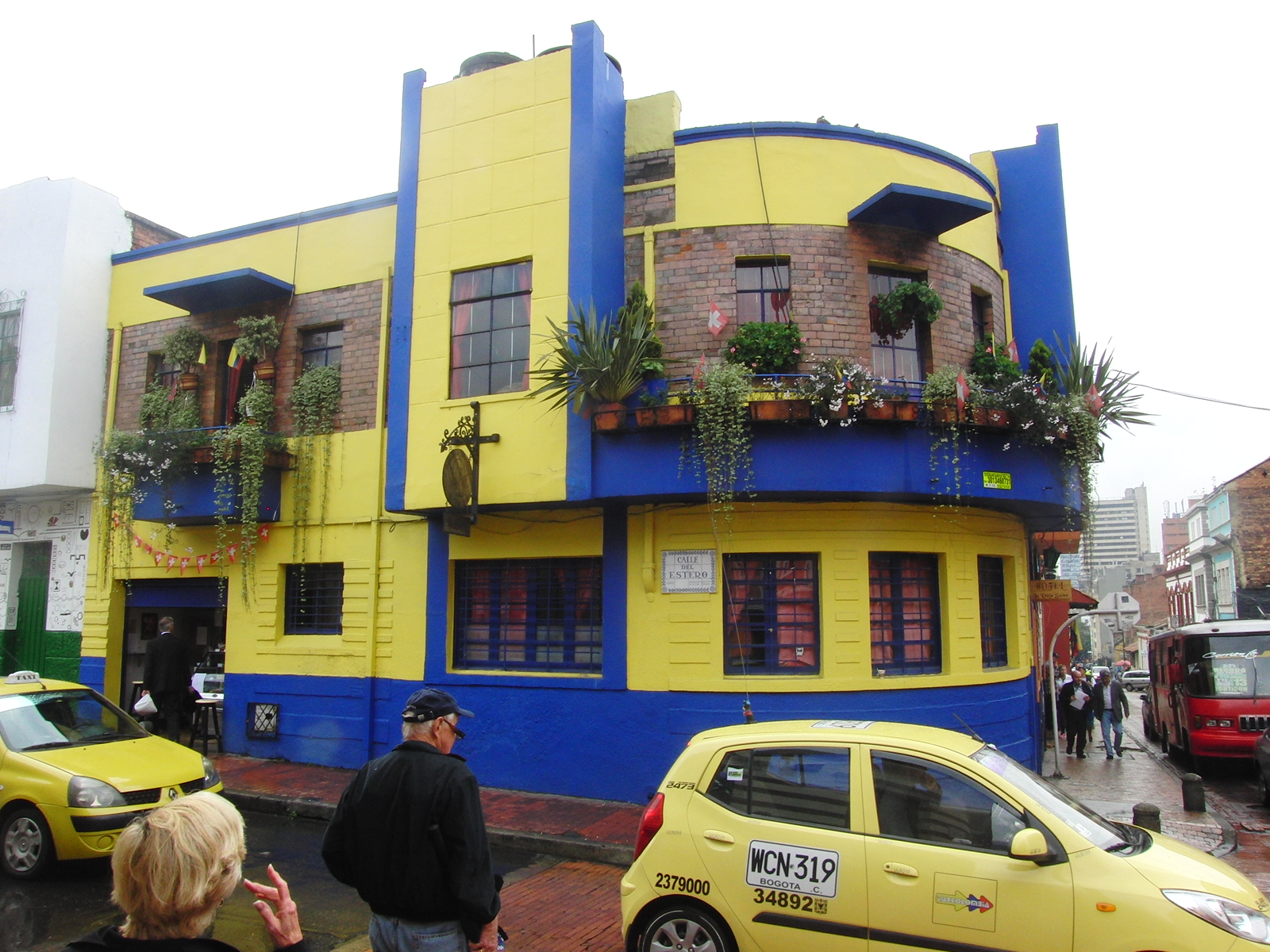
Art deco house - La Vieja Suiza, Calle 12 No. 3-07 Bogotá, Colombia

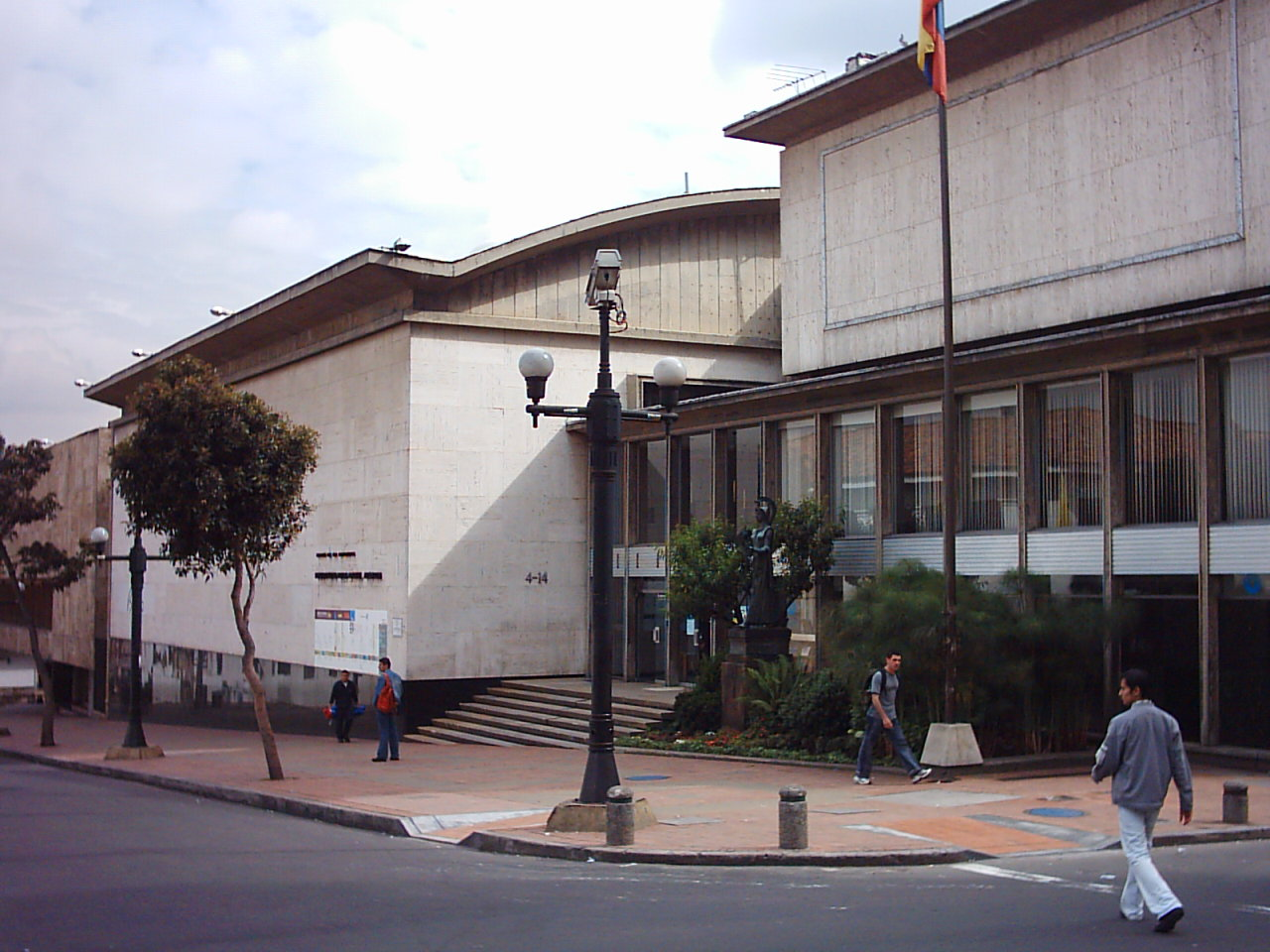
The Luís Ángel Arango Library facade and part of 11th street at La Candelaria neighborhood.

- Botero Museum, located on Carrera 11, contains works by painter/sculptor Fernando Botero as well as works by artists including Monet and Picasso from Botero's private collection.
- Luis Angel Arango Library is the most important library of Colombia, property of the Republic Bank; has more than 1.1 million books and is the most visited public library in Latin America, has facilities of parking, cafeteria, museums, concert hall, and exposition areas. you need coins to leave your bag in the checkroom.
- Gold Museum is one of the most important museums of Colombia, It has a collection of more than 36,000 pieces in gold, wood, shell and stone organized in its three floors; the museum is property of the Republic Bank and is located in front of Santander Park.
- Colón Theater is one of the most representative theatres of Colombia, with a neoclassic architecture, was built by the Italian architect Pietro Cantini, founded in 1892; has more than 2,400 square metres (26,000 sq ft) for 900 people.
- Monserrate is the symbol by excellence of the Colombian capital. The hill is a pilgrim destination, as well as a tourist attraction. In addition to the church, there is a restaurant. Monserrate can be accessed by aerial tramway, a funicular or by climbing, the preferred way of pilgrims. You can see it from nearly every point in Bogota.
- La Puerta Falsa is a 200-year-old shop specializing in chocolate and tamales. It is located right next to the presidential palace.
- Silva Poetry House
- Bogotá Urban Development Museum
- Military Museum
- Rafael Pombo Poetry House
- Avianca Building
- Camarín del Carmen theater
- Quevedo brook plaza (Plaza del Chorro de Quevedo)
- Bolívar Square

== Churches ==
- Primada Cathedral
- Church of San Francisco
- San Agustín Church
- Del Carmen Church

== Universities ==
- University of the Andes
- Our Lady of the Rosary University
- La Salle University
- Universidad Externado de Colombia
- La Gran Colombia University
- Unified National Corporation of Higher Education (CUN)

== Climate ==
Climate data for La Candelaria (Venado Oro Vivero), elevation 2,725 m (8,940 ft), (1971–2000)
Month	Jan	Feb	Mar	Apr	May	Jun	Jul	Aug	Sep	Oct	Nov	Dec	Year
Mean daily maximum °C (°F)	19.6 (67.3)	18.9 (66.0)	18.8 (65.8)	18.7 (65.7)	18.6 (65.5)	18.1 (64.6)	17.5 (63.5)	17.7 (63.9)	18.3 (64.9)	18.3 (64.9)	18.3 (64.9)	18.8 (65.8)	18.4 (65.1)
Daily mean °C (°F)	12.9 (55.2)	13.1 (55.6)	13.3 (55.9)	13.4 (56.1)	13.2 (55.8)	13.0 (55.4)	12.5 (54.5)	12.6 (54.7)	12.8 (55.0)	12.9 (55.2)	12.8 (55.0)	12.8 (55.0)	13 (55)
Mean daily minimum °C (°F)	7.9 (46.2)	8.5 (47.3)	9.0 (48.2)	9.5 (49.1)	9.7 (49.5)	9.4 (48.9)	9.0 (48.2)	8.6 (47.5)	8.6 (47.5)	8.7 (47.7)	8.9 (48.0)	8.1 (46.6)	8.9 (48.0)
Average precipitation mm (inches)	70.6 (2.78)	74.6 (2.94)	107.3 (4.22)	125.5 (4.94)	129.0 (5.08)	72.8 (2.87)	70.3 (2.77)	64.0 (2.52)	59.9 (2.36)	128.6 (5.06)	142.8 (5.62)	89.4 (3.52)	1,134.6 (44.67)
Average precipitation days	8	11	14	17	20	21	21	20	15	17	17	13	183
Average relative humidity (%)	80	80	81	82	83	82	82	81	80	82	83	81	81
Mean monthly sunshine hours	124.0	101.6	89.9	75.0	83.7	93.0	102.3	108.5	93.0	80.6	75.0	102.3	1,128.9
Mean daily sunshine hours	4.0	3.6	2.9	2.5	2.7	3.1	3.3	3.5	3.1	2.6	2.5	3.3	3.1
Source: Instituto de Hidrologia Meteorologia y Estudios Ambientales

== See also ==
- La Calera, Cundinamarca, a municipality and town located 18 kilometres northeast of Bogotá through a gap in the Eastern Hills
