= La Salle University, Colombia =

Private Catholic university in Bogotá, Colombia

La Salle University
- Universidad de La Salle
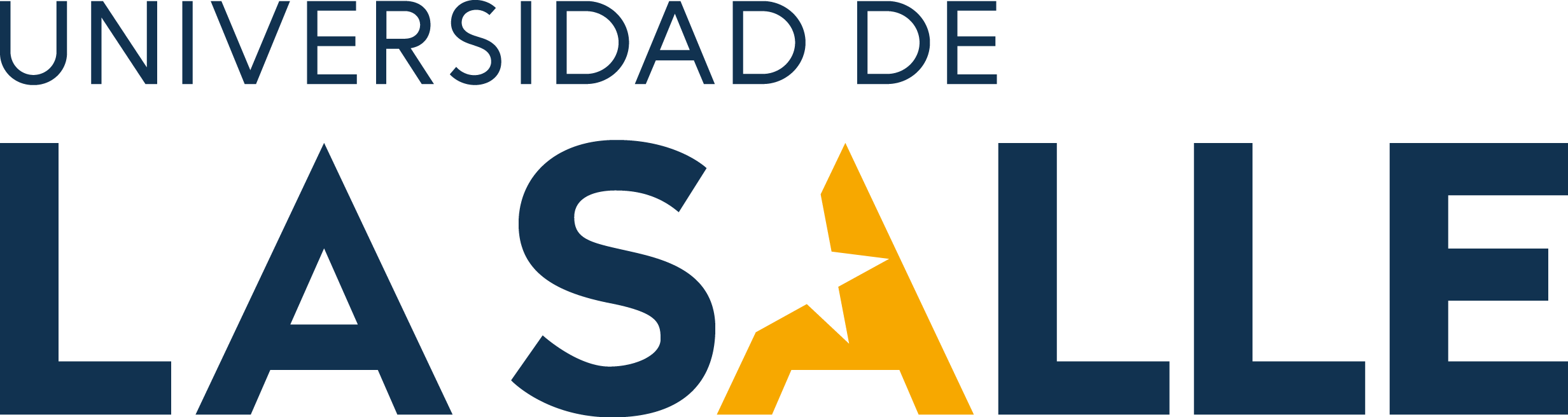
- Motto: Educar para pensar, decidir y servir (Spanish)
- Motto in English: Educate to think, decide and serve
- Type: Private; Roman Catholic
- Established: 1964; 62 years ago
- Founder: Institute of the Brothers of the Christian Schools
- Religious affiliation: Roman Catholic (Christian Brothers)
- Academic affiliations: AIUL ASCUN; ACAC FIUC; ODUCAL IALU
- Principal: Bro. Carlos Gabriel Gomez Restrepo, FSC
- Faculty: 338 as of 2012; 245 full-time 93 part-time
- Students: 15,290 (2016)
- Location: Bogotá, D.C., Cundinamarca, Colombia; 4.643957°N 74.060255°W
- Campus: Urban 9 hectares (90,000 m^{2})
- Colors: Blue and White
- Nickname: Unisalle
- Website: www.lasalle.edu.co
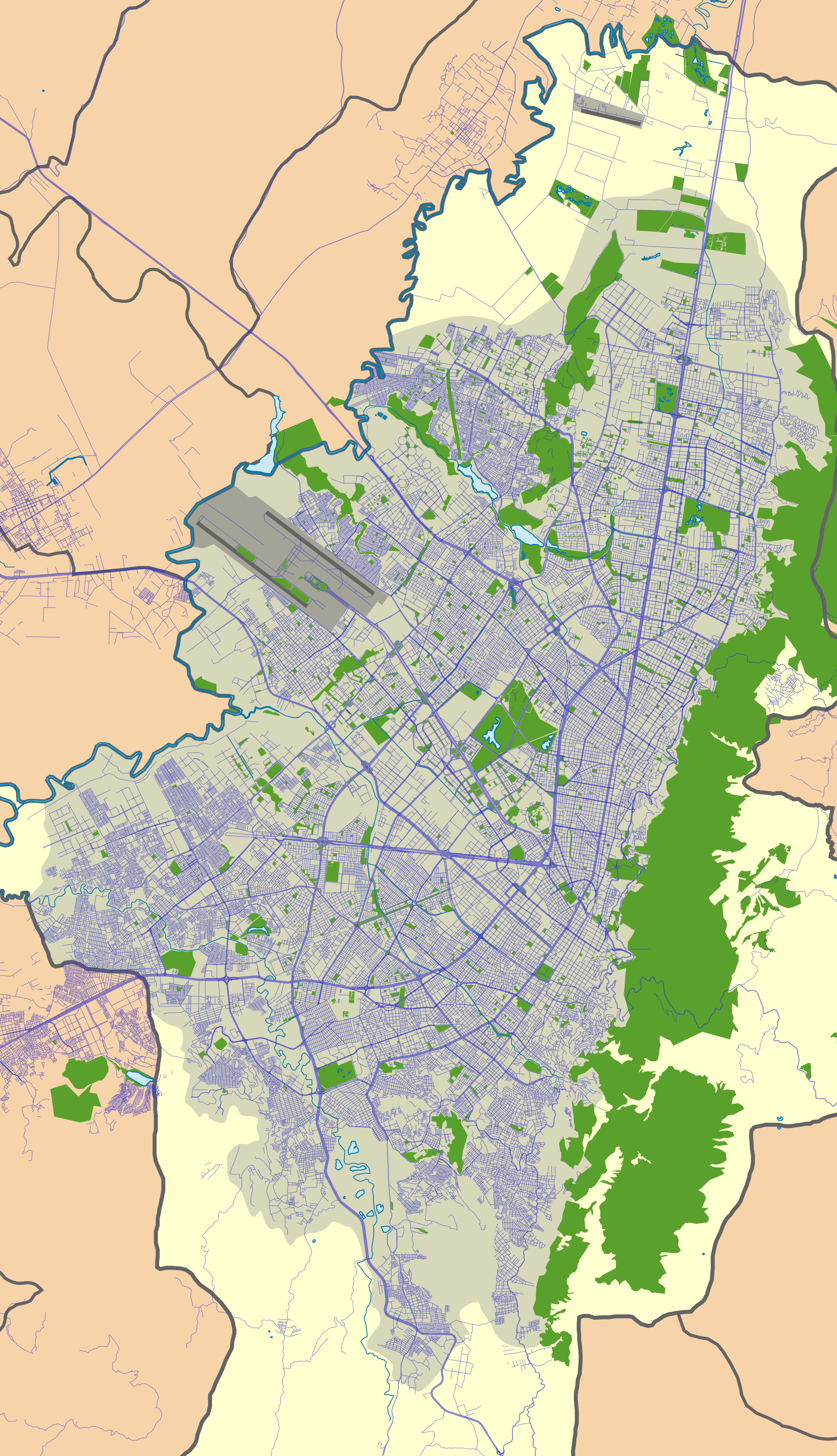
- Location within Bogotá

The Universidad de La Salle is a private, Catholic and Lasallian institution of higher education run by the Institute of the Brothers of the Christian Schools in Bogotá, D.C., Cundinamarca, Colombia. It was founded by the Christian Brothers in 1964. It has 4 locations: 3 in Bogotá DC- one in the downtown area, in Chapinero, and in the northern section of city. There is also a campus in El Yopal, Casanare in the East of the Country. This campus is the seat where the La Salle has developed the most innovative social and educational projects for young farmers, victims of violence in Colombia.

The university is accredited as a High Quality University by the NAC or National Accreditation Council (CNA or Consejo Nacional de Acreditacion in Spanish). It also has an ISO 9001/2008 certification.

The university has eight colleges offering 23 academic degree programs, 16 specialization programs and 5 master's degrees. Currently, the university has 13,950 students matriculated in degree programs and 700 students in postgraduate courses. As of 2012, the university has a team of 245 full-time teachers, 91 mid-time teachers and 2 three quarter-time teachers. Of those, 209 have undefined term contracts, 29 are doctors, 194 have master's degrees and 112 are specialists. As of 2012, the university has graduated more than 40,000 students since its foundation in 1964.

The University of La Salle is a private institution and its educational vision is based on the Christian vision of the human and his environment.

== History ==
The university began its academic labors in the first semester of 1965 with programs in Economy, Philosophy, Civil Engineering, and degrees in Chemistry, Biology, Mathematics and Physics. At that time the institution had a team of 20 teachers and 98 students.

It is recognized by the Colombian government, governed by its own original statute under the national constitution and by Law 30 of 1992 and its statutory decrees.

It was founded by the Institute of the Brothers of the Christian Schools (known as The Lasallian Brothers) on 15 November 1964. The university was recognized as such through decree No 1583 of 11 August 1975 issued by the National Government.

Today the university offers 21 academic degree programs in different areas of knowledge of which 5 are education programs- 16 specialization programs- of which three are education- and 5 master's degrees. Currently it has 13,521 matriculated students in degree programs and 462 students in postgraduate programs who are taught by 1,014 teachers, of which 87% have postgraduate degrees and 739 have management and service degrees.

Since its foundation, the university has taken special care in the quality and efficiency of its education that has given it prestige nationally and internationally. The university has an educational philosophy inspired by the Catholic educational model of the Lasallian brothers, whose organization is currently present in more than 80 countries around the globe (Africa 22; America 22; Asia 15; Europe 18 and Australia/Oceania 3) and a history of more than 320 years serving as educators to youth. The university is part of the AIUL (Asociacion Internacional de Universidades Lasallistas- Spanish for International Association of Lasallian Universities), created in 1998.

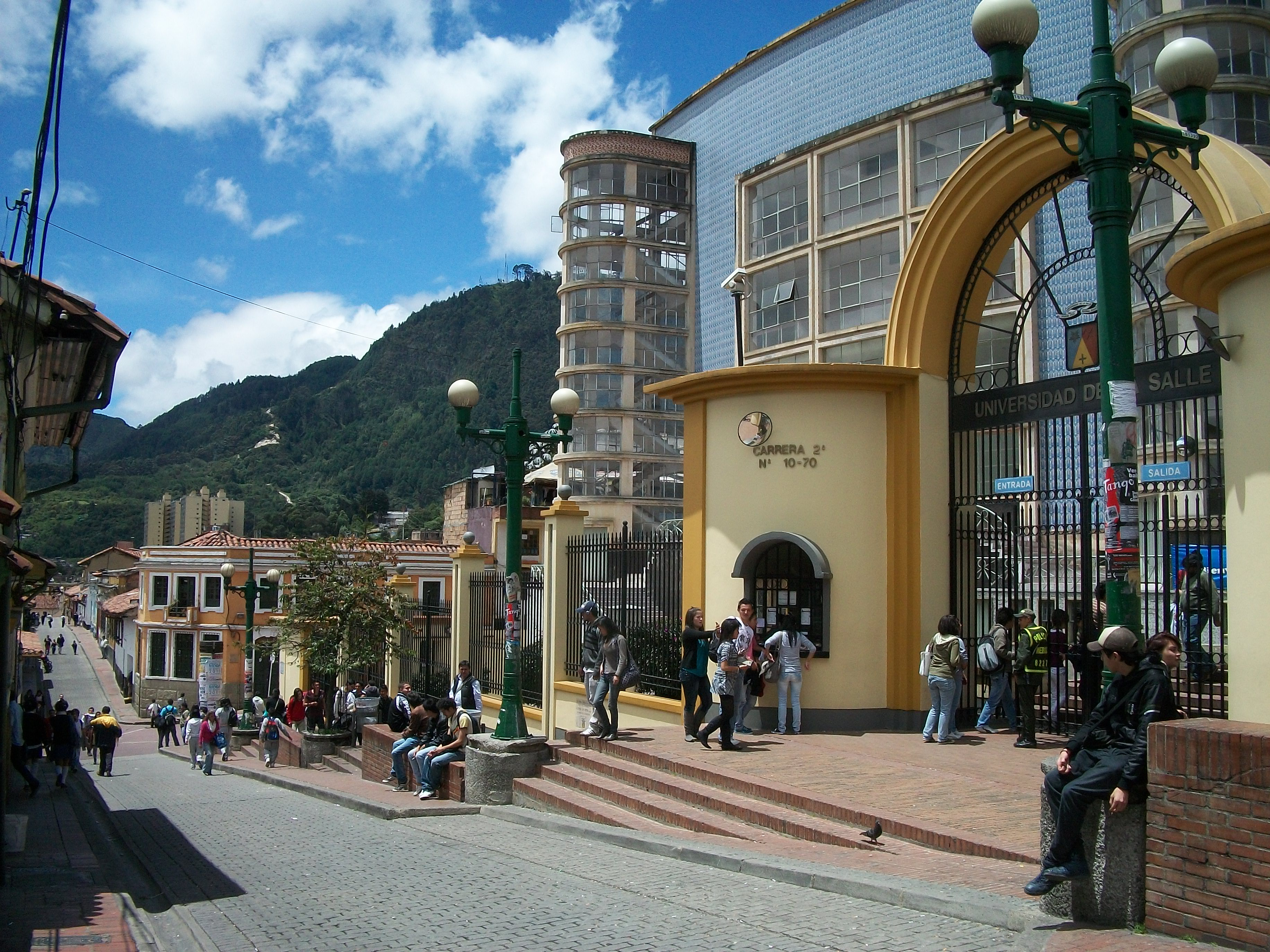
La Salle University Candelaria

The La Salle University is a member of the Asociacion Colombiana de Universidades (Colombian Association of Universities), ASCUN, the Ascociacion Colombiana para el avance de la ciencia (Colombian Association for the advancement of science) ACAC, the FIUC (International Federation of Catholic Universities), the ODUCAL (Interamerican Universities Organization), the International Association of Lasallian Universities IALU, the COLUMBUS program, among others.

== Locations ==
The University of La Salle has three campuses located in the city of Bogotá and one more in Yopal (Casanare) with an approximate area of 90,000 square metres (970,000 sq ft).

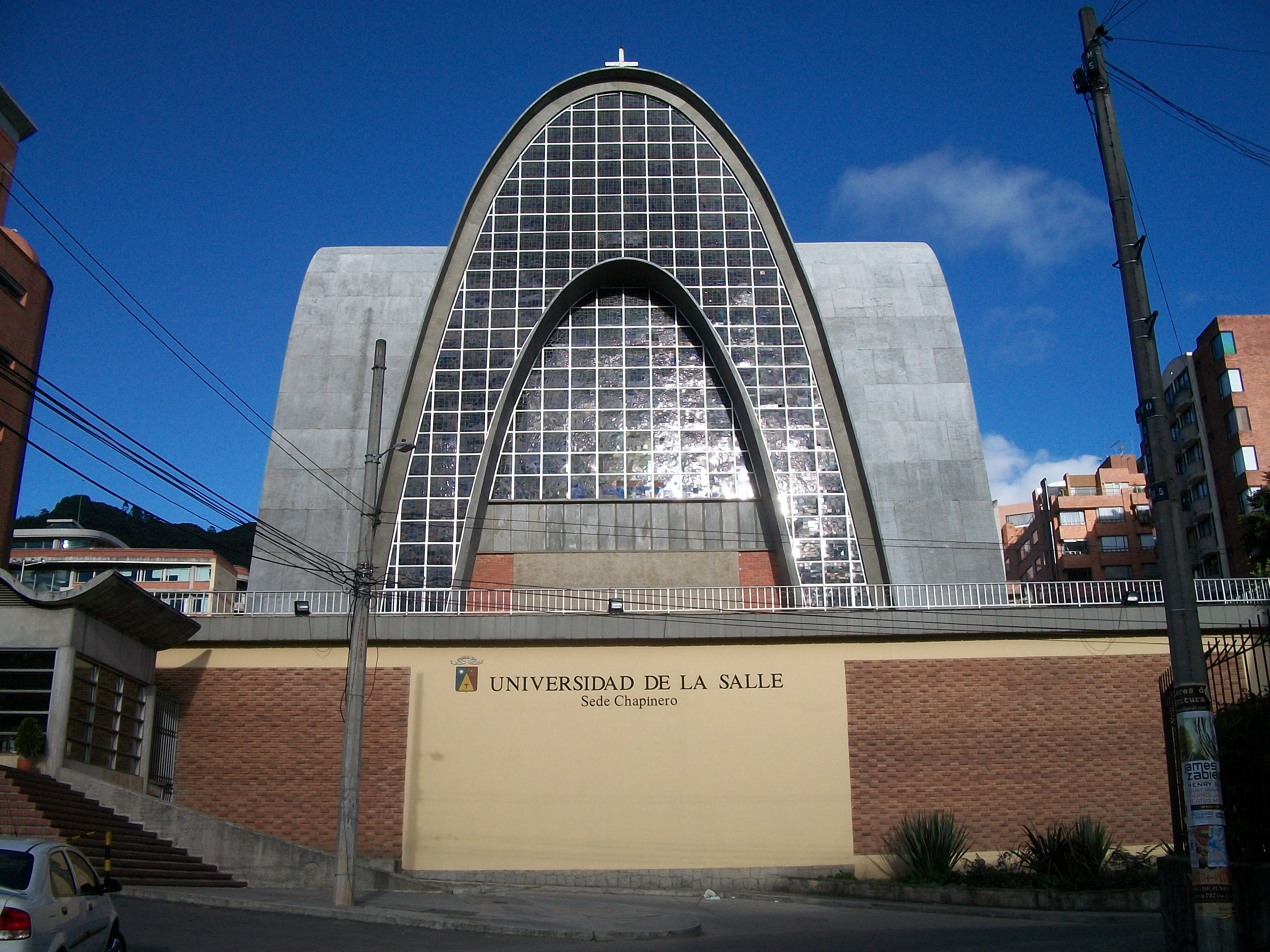
La Salle University – Chapinero

One campus is located in the cultural center of the city La Candelaria. On this campus are the programs of Architecture, Design and Urbanism, Management and Engineering. It has a theater that functions as an auditorium.

There is a second campus located in the Chapinero district, that also has a theater used by several institutions including the district and the La Salle schools. The third campus is located in the North of the city, where it has a more spacious area and accommodates the agricultural sciences.

=== Chapels ===
As a sign of the Catholic affiliation of the university, each campus has a chapel, with free public access. Every chapel is coordinated by the pastor of each campus.

=== Chapel of La Santa Cruz (La Candelaria) ===
The Chapel of La Santa Cruz is located in the La Candelaria campus. It was built in 1933, years before the foundation of the university as it is known today. The chapel was initially planned to serve as a private chapel for the Lasallian Brothers' Institute and its students, but due to the destruction caused to the institute's original building on the night of 9 April 1948 in the Bogotazo revolt, the chapel was eventually repaired to become part of the new university established in the first semester of 1965. Currently, the chapel is a living example of the long history of the Lasallian brothers in Colombia. One of the main characteristics of this chapel that shows its history, is an organ which is used on special occasions. The organ is one of three such organs existing in the city.

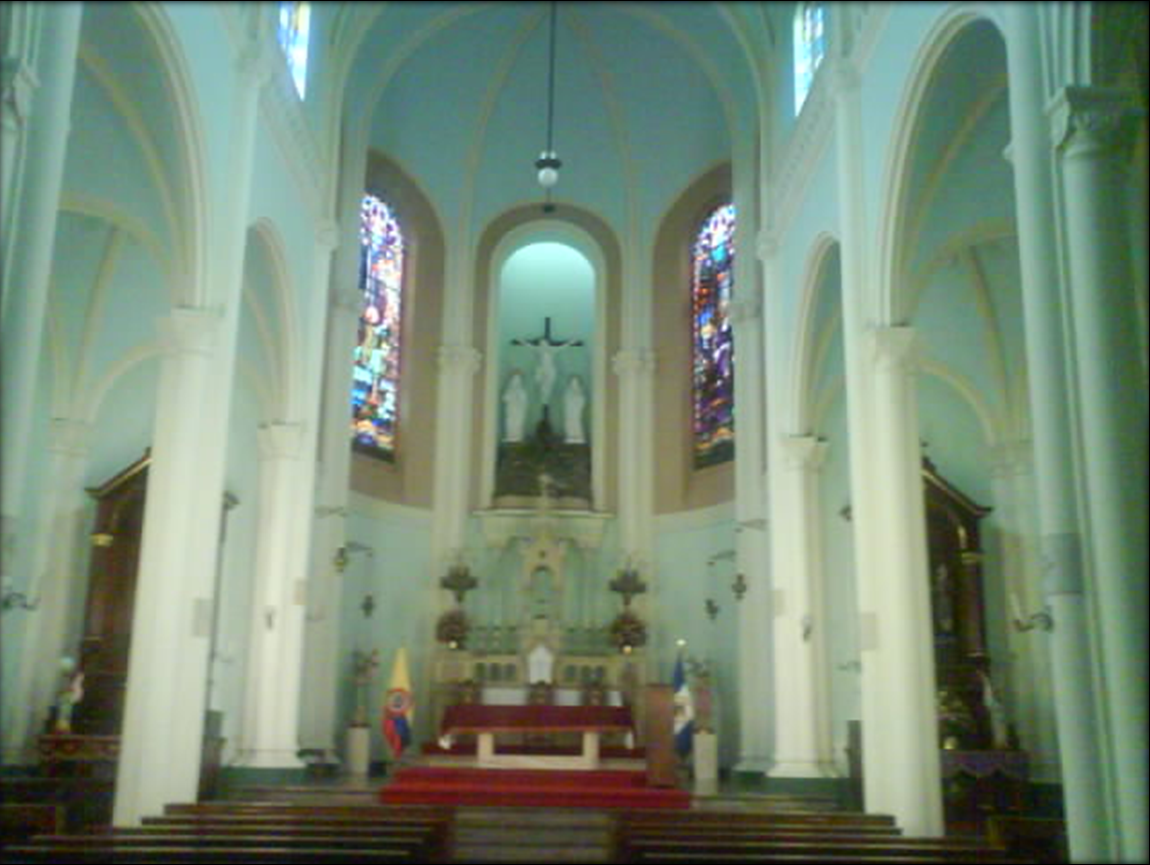
High altar of the La Santa Cruz Chapel

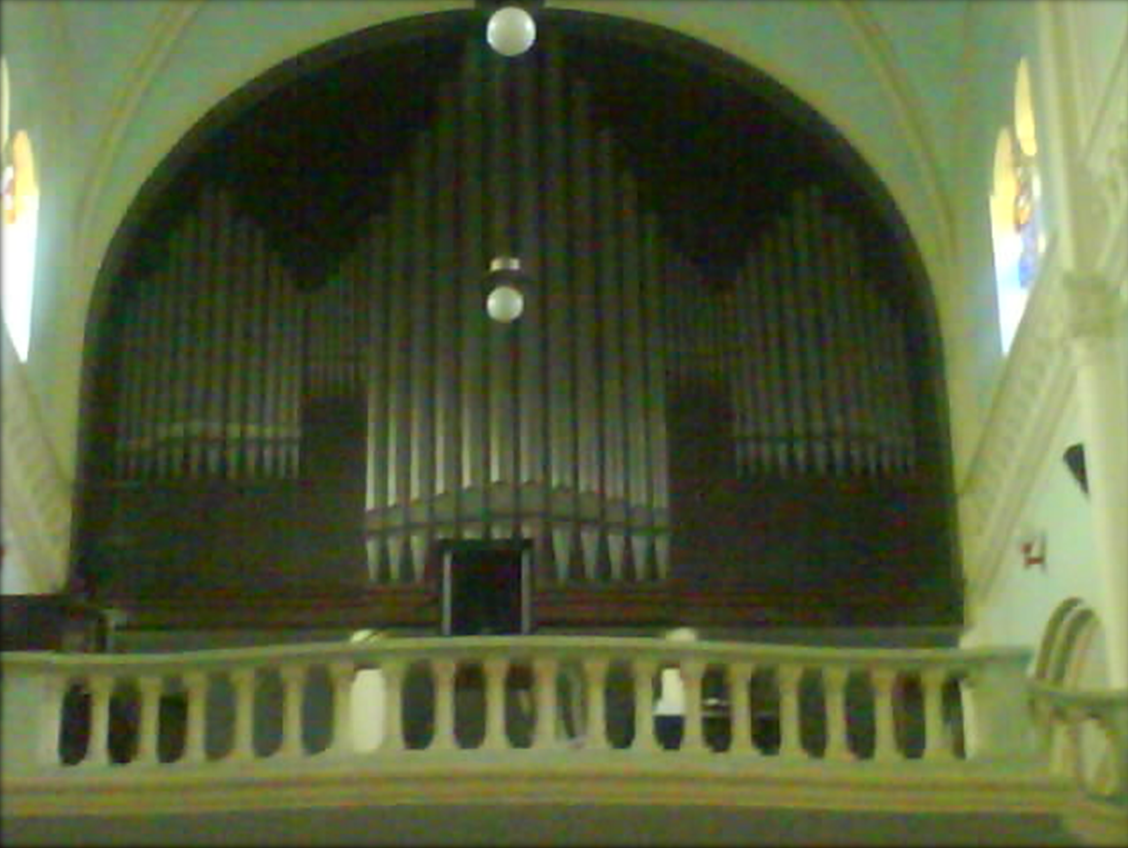
Organ of the La Santa Cruz chapel

=== Chapel of the Star (Chapinero) ===
The Chapel of the Star is one of the most significant buildings on the Chapinero campus, because of its distinctive arched shape. The chapel was built as part of the project of the campus. Its name comes from one of the universal symbols of the Lasallian brothers, The Mary's star.

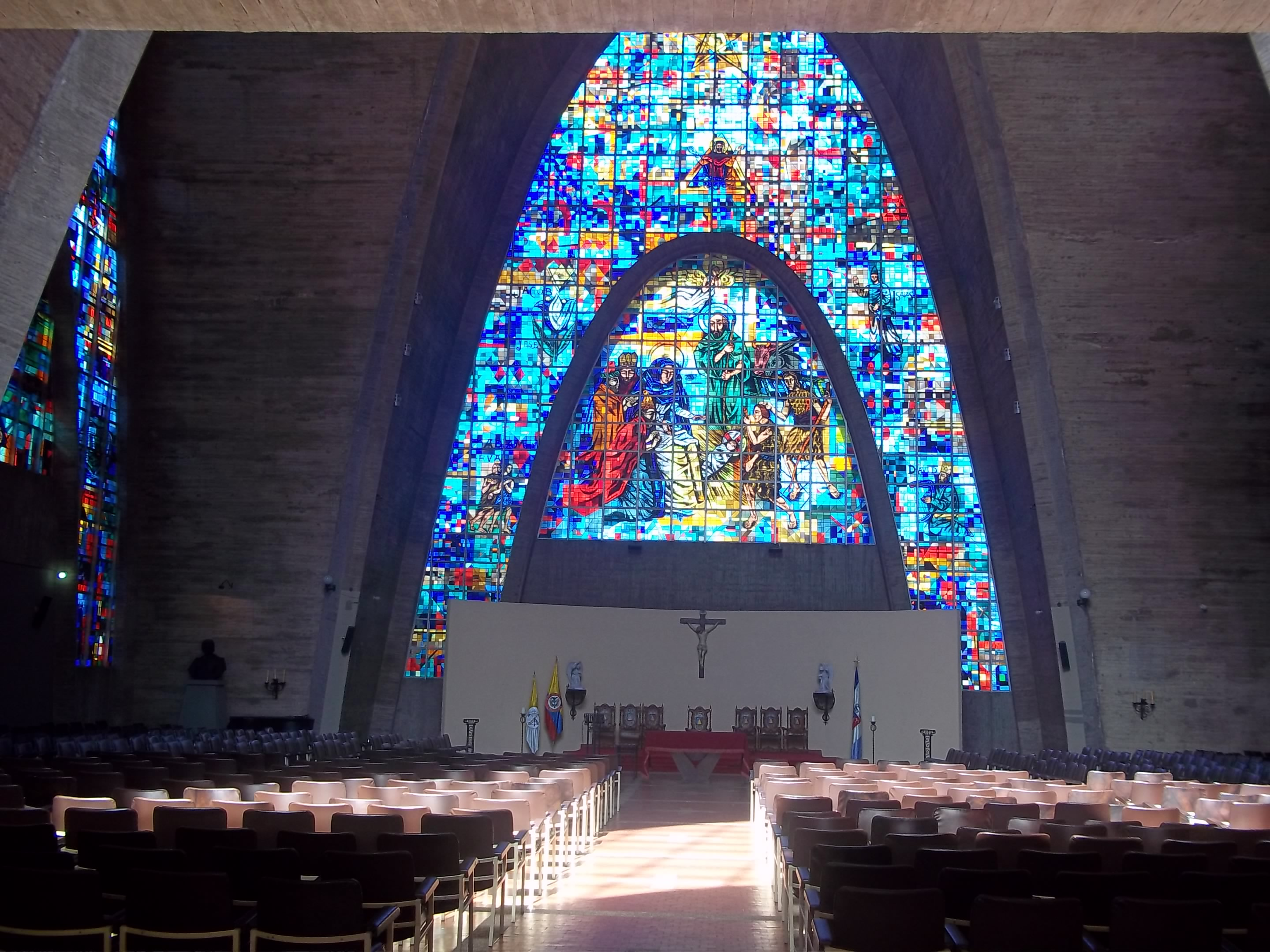
Inside of the Star chapel, it can be seen a glass with the Christmas scene on it

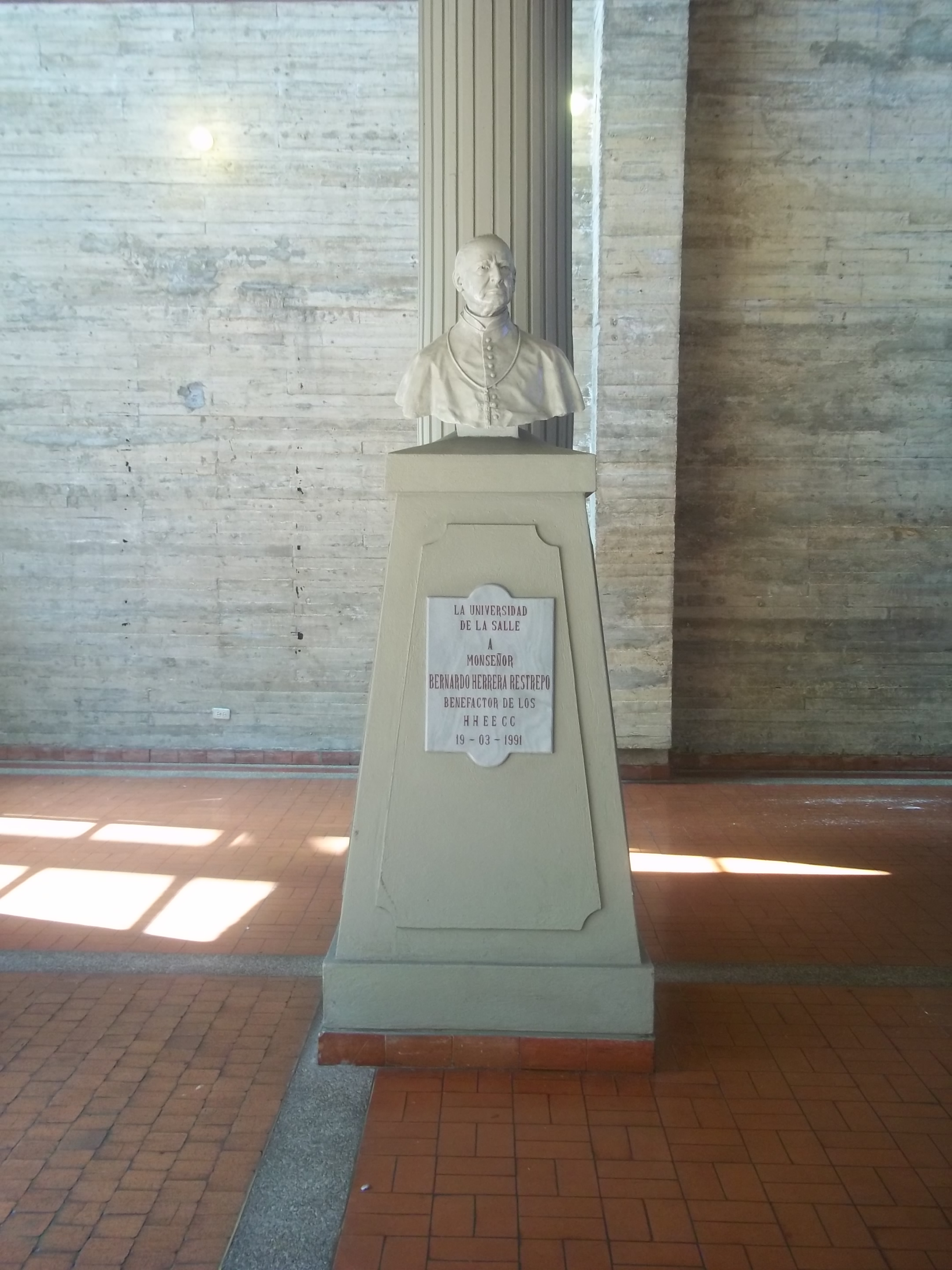
Monseñor Herrera's bust inside the Star chapel

== Faculties and programs ==
- Faculty of Management and Accounting Sciences
  - Enterprise management
  - Public accountancy
- Faculty of Agricultural Sciences
  - Management of agricultural enterprises
  - Agronomic engineering
  - Veterinarian medicine
  - Zootenia
- Faculty of Educational Sciences
  - Religious education degree
  - Spanish language, English and French degrees
- Faculty of Habitat's sciences
  - Architecture
  - Urbanism
- Faculty of health sciences
  - Optometry
- Faculty of Economic and Social Sciences
  - Economy
  - Finance and International Sciences
  - Business and International Relations
  - Information Systems, Library and Archival Sciences
  - Social work
- Faculty of Philosophy and Humanities
  - Philosophy
- Faculty of engineering
  - Environmental engineering
  - Civil Engineering
  - Food Engineering
  - Automation engineering
  - Electric Engineering
  - Industrial Engineering

== Departments ==
- Department of Basic Sciences
- Department of Lasallian formation

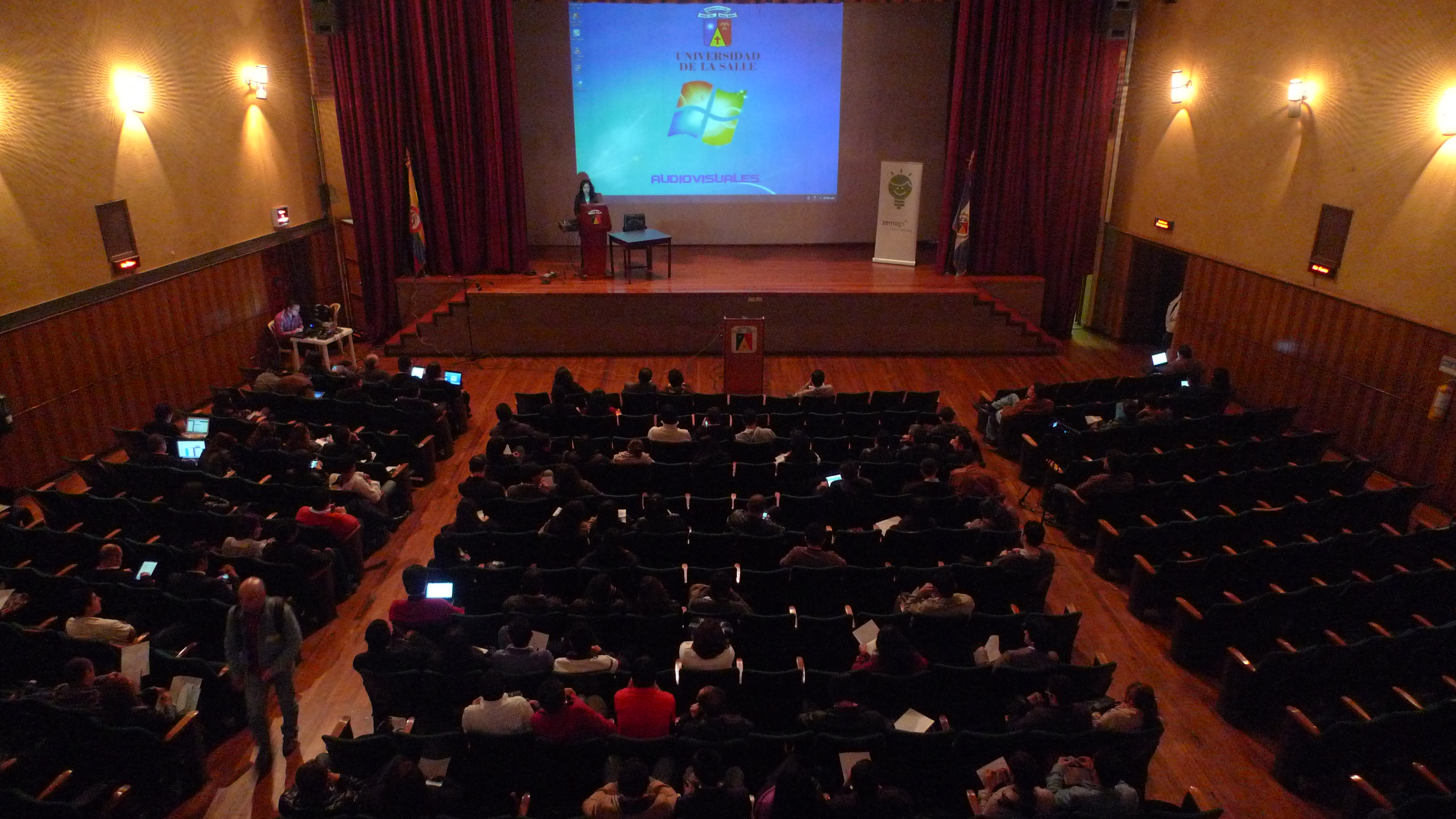
La Candelaria Auditorium

== Anthem ==
In accordance with Act No 13 of October 25, 1979 of the directive council, the then Principal of the university, Dr. Jaime Gonzalez Santos announced a competition to compose the university's anthem.

In response, more than thirty compositions were presented from which ten were chosen in the semi-final stage of the competition and from them a winner was chosen. The winner is now the current anthem of the university, representing all the work of the Lasallian brothers since their arrival in the country.

The music was composed by Heriberto Morán Vivas, with direction by Francisco Javier Cuevas Romero.

=== Lyrics (Spanish) ===
Chorus

En la Atenas señera, La Salle
alza el vuelo cual águila azul
¡juventudes! A vuestra alma mater
ensalzad al compás del laúd

I
Con el sabio arzobispo Bernardo
se regó la simiente de luz,
que se filtra en el mar y en el nardo
y florece a los pies de la cruz

II
En la ciencia y la técnica el claustro
forma egregias legiones de honor
que conquistan sin miedos al austro
el cenit coruscante del sol.

III
¡Lasallistas! la América Hispana
ya no sueña en doctrina falaz;
del amor escuchad la campana;
nos congrega en abrazo de Paz.

IV
Si el Señor e La Salle volviera
esta tierra ardería en caridad
y en el "Signum Fidei" encendiera
el blasón de la Universidad.

Letra del Himno: Maestro Camilo Orbes Moreno
Música: Heriberto Morán Vivas
Arreglos: Francisco Javier Cuevas Romero

== Museums ==
- La Salle Museum

== La Salle worldwide ==
Worldwide the Lasallian Brothers are present in every known educational modality. They work in more than 80 countries and direct primary and secondary schools and universities. The university is currently linked with other 84 Lasallian institutions of higher education in the IALU (International Association of Lasallian Universities).

In Colombia, La Salle is divided into two districts: the district of Bogotá and Medellín.

== Images ==
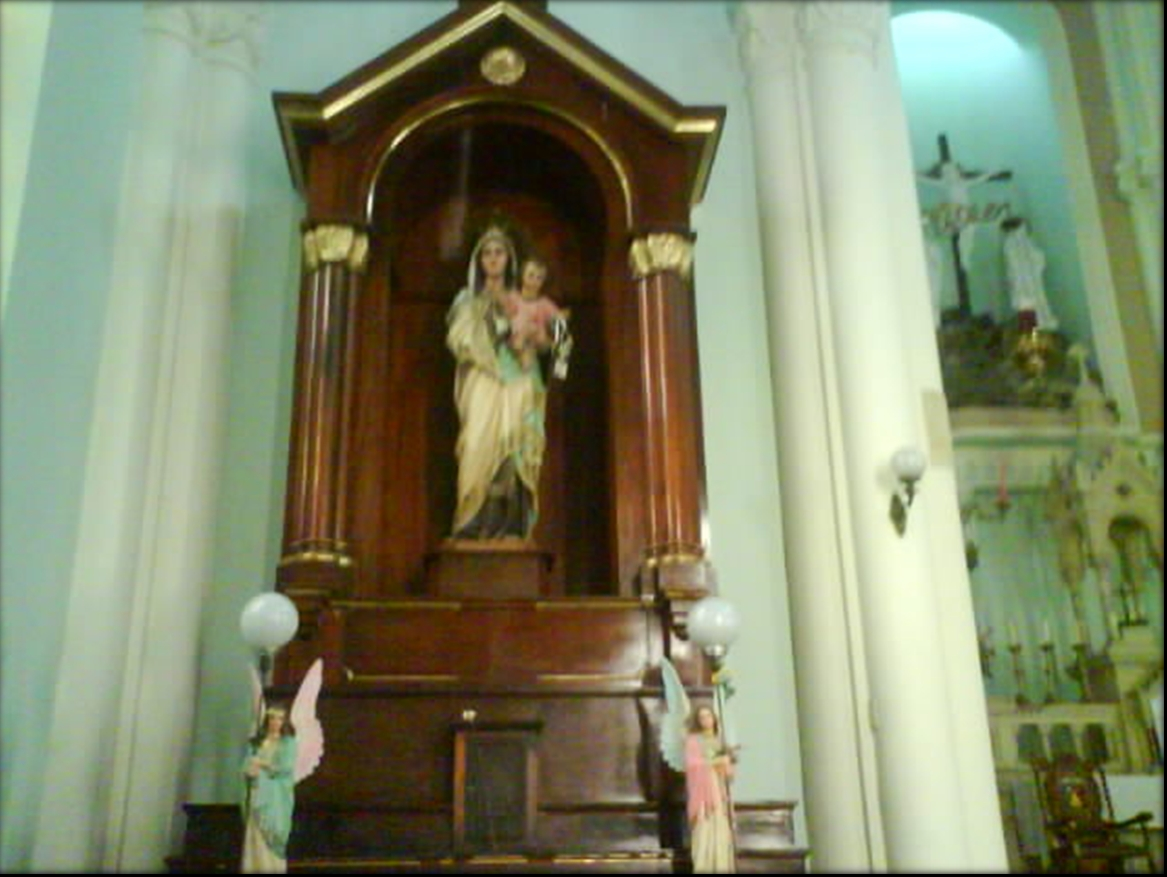
Mary's statue at the Santa Cruz Chapel.

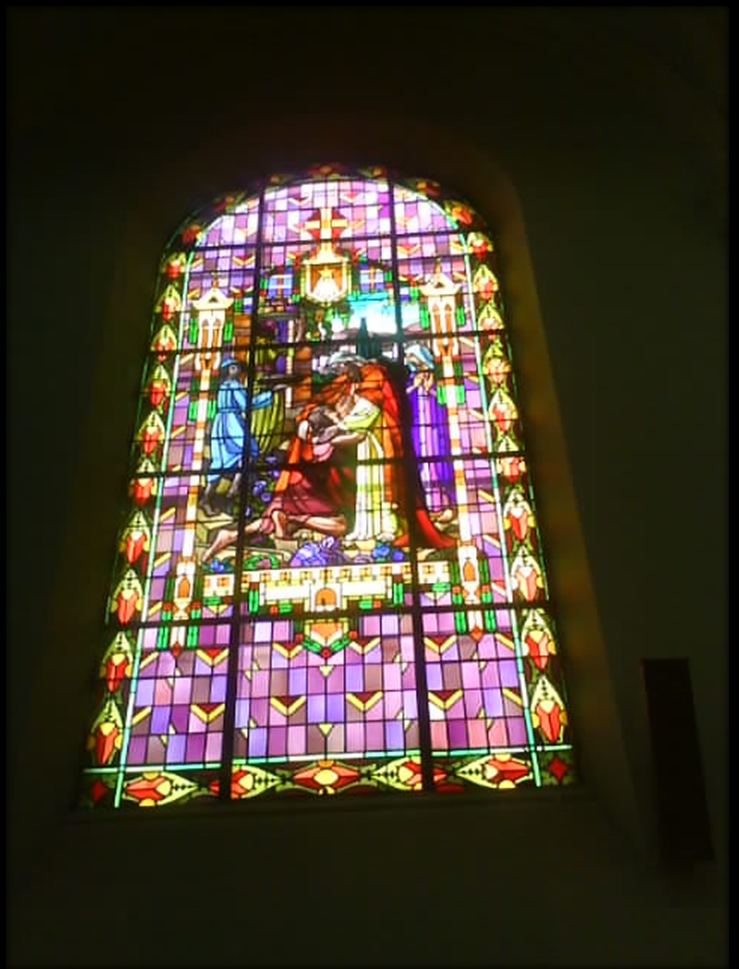
One of the stained- glasses of the La Santa Cruz chapel.

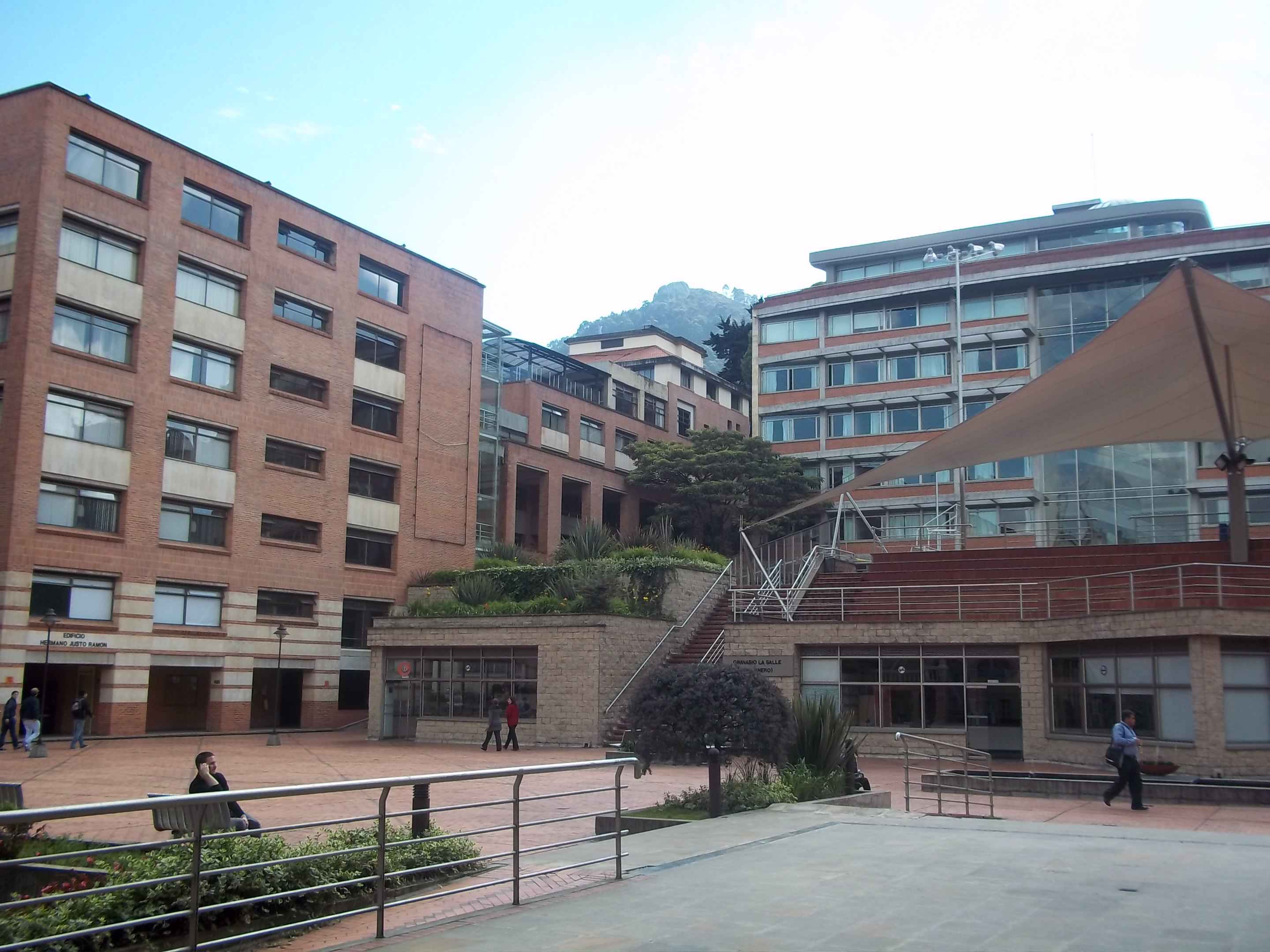
Buildings of the Chapinero's see.

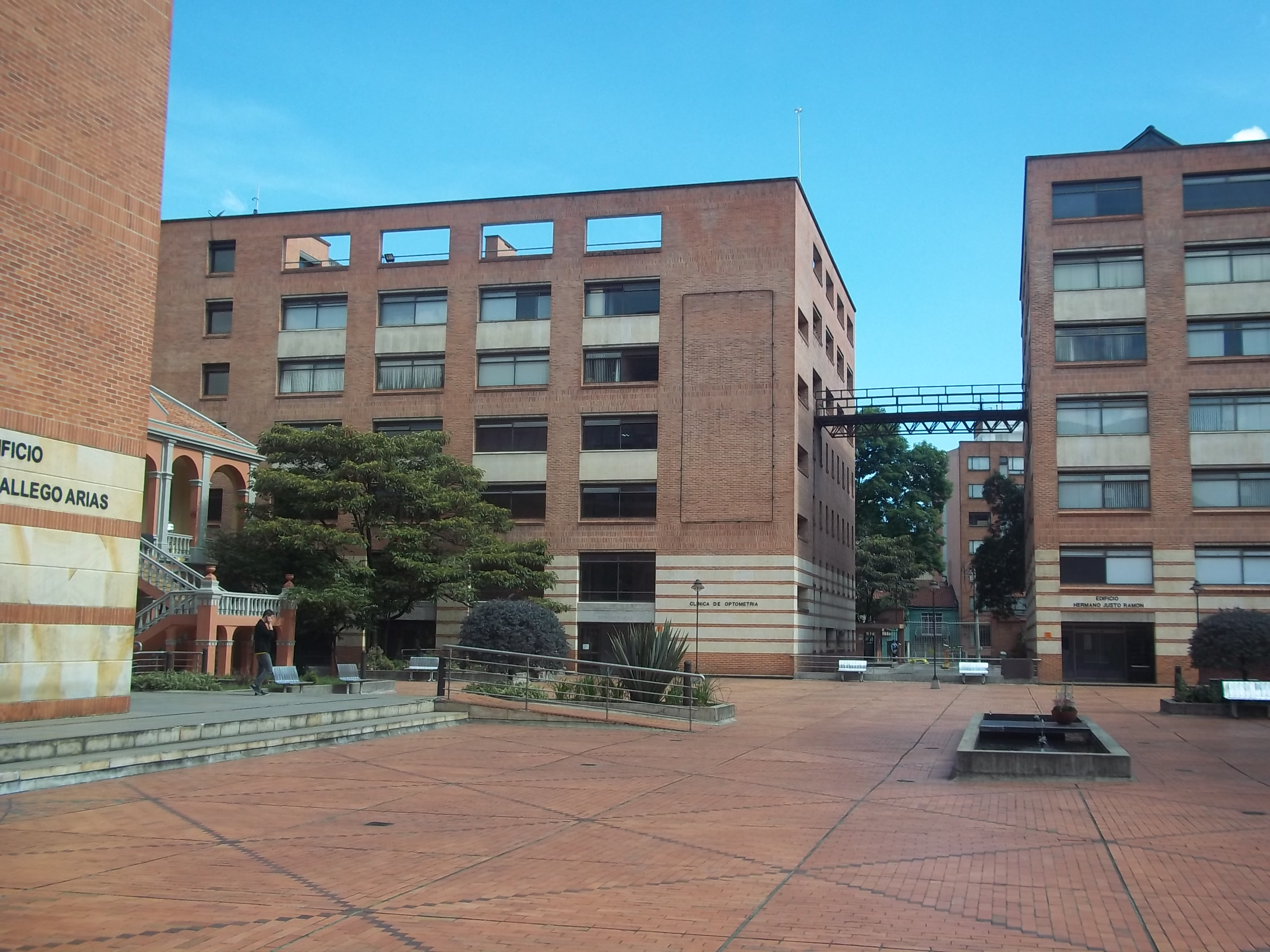
Optometry Clinic.
