= Chorro de Quevedo =

Fountain in Bogotá, Colombia

Coordinates: 4°35′52″N 74°04′11″W

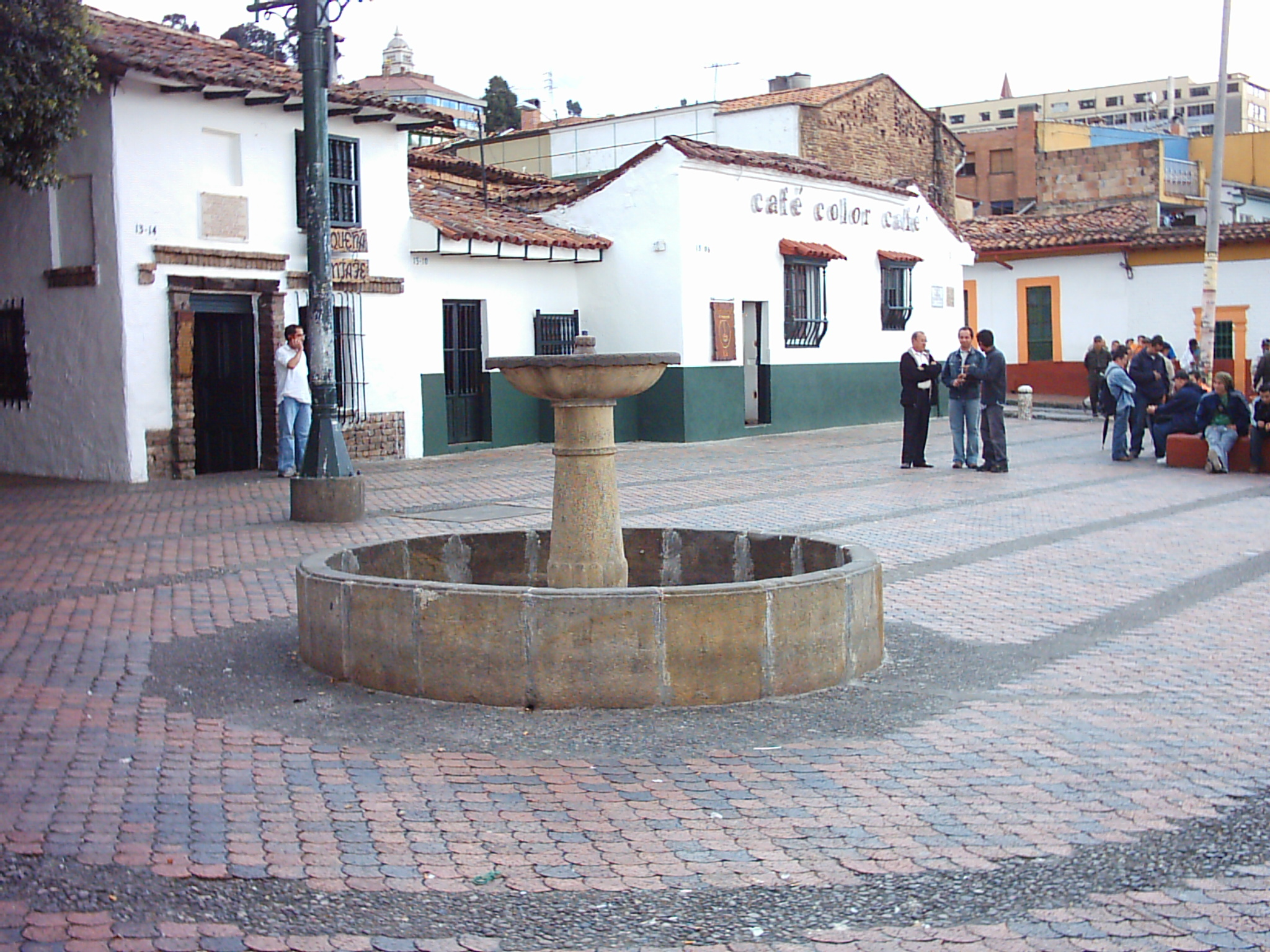
Chorro de Quevedo

Chorro de Quevedo (Quevedo's fountain) is a fountain located in the neighborhood of La Candelaria in Bogotá. It signifies the purported location where Gonzalo Jiménez de Quesada, a Spanish conquistador, first established the foundations of Bogotá in 1538. Also, it is considered the place where the Zipa, or chief of the Muisca tribe, would regularly survey the Bogotá savanna. In 1832, an Augustine priest named Father Quevedo purchased the site and built a fountain there. The original fountain was destroyed in 1896, due to pipe damage from a collapsing bridge. It is located above Calle 13 and Carrera 2.

In the plaza, there is a small white chapel called the Hermitage of San Miguel del Principe that was re-built in 1969 on the site of the very first chapel in Bogotá. It is based on a reconstruction of a church that was once in Santander Plaza but razed because the external appearance was too plain. The church steps and the nearby arch were built by Javier Olave to recognize the local "lunatics": Bobo del Tranvía, the Conde Cuchute, the Loca Margarita.

Several films have been shot at this location, including La Estrategia del Caracol and Diástole y Sístole. These films reflect the bohemian subculture of the area. There are narrow alleyways nearby that have artist studios and hostels. Colorful street art can be found on nearby walls. There are also local establishments nearby that serve chicha.

In the square, public storytellers can be found.
