= Aurelio París Sanz de Santamaría =

Colombian businessman and entrepreneur (1829-1899)

Aurelio Paris Sanz de Santamaría
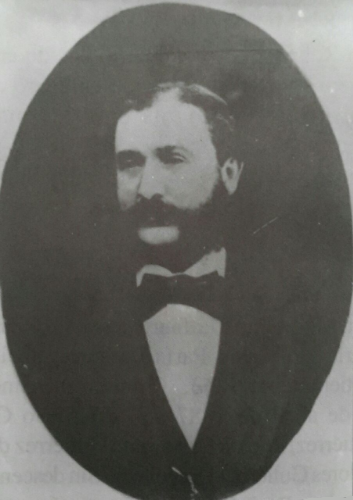
- Aurelio París Sanz de Santamaría
- Born: 29 August 1829; Bogotá, Gran Colombia
- Died: 28 February 1899 (aged 69); Anapoima, Colombia
- Political party: Conservative Party
- Father: Mariano Paris Ricaurte

Aurelio París Sanz de Santamaría (29 August 1829 – 28 February 1899) was a Colombian businessman and entrepreneur.

== Early life ==
Aurelio París was born on 29 August 1829 in Bogotá, Gran Colombia. His father was Mariano Paris Ricaurte.
