= Avenida Jiménez =

Street in Bogotá, Colombia

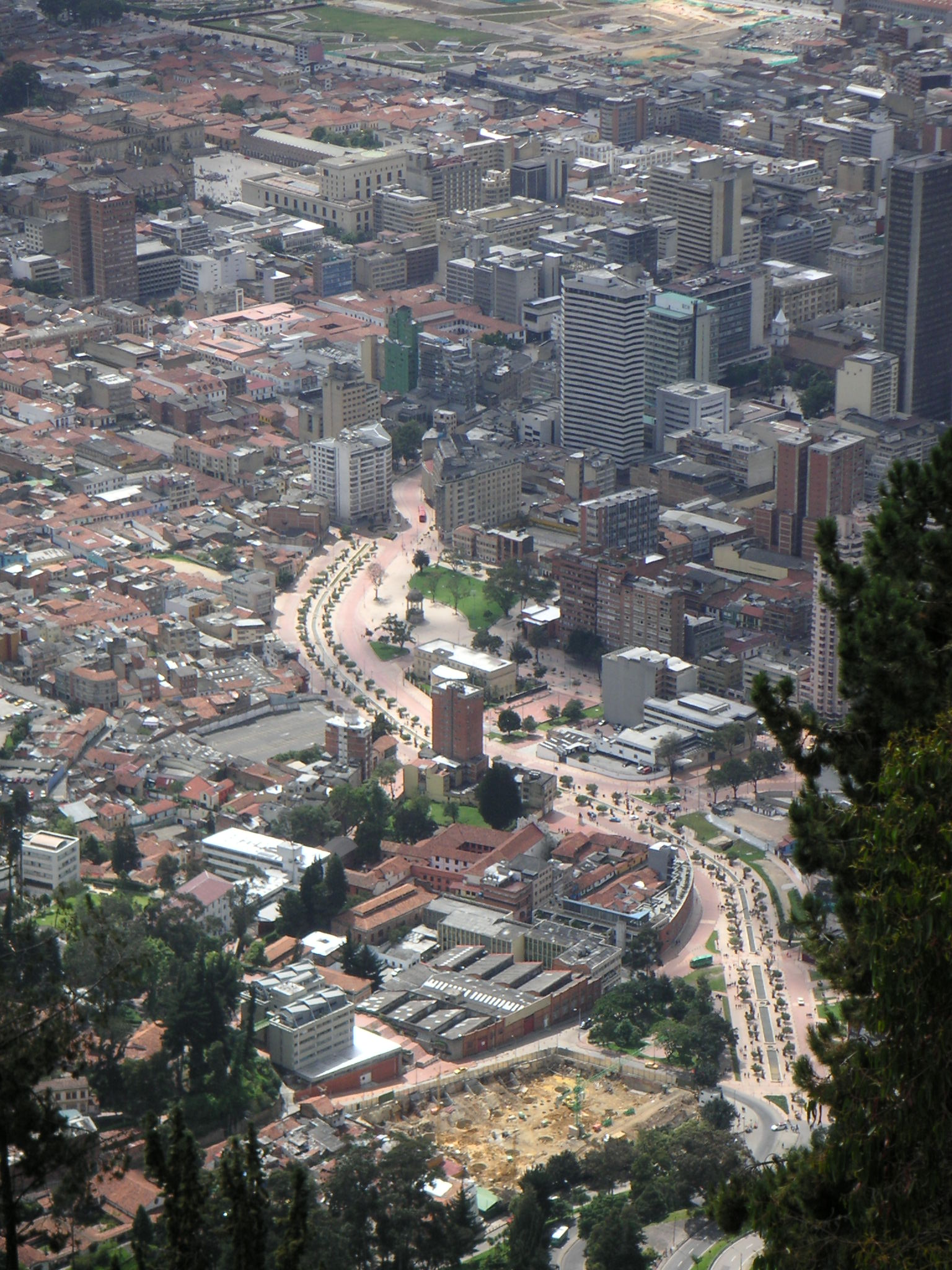
- Location: Bogotá; Colombia
- East end: Teleférico de Monserrate
- West end: Avenida Caracas

Construction
- Inauguration: 1930; 96 years ago

Avenida Jiménez is a thoroughfare that runs through the locality of La Candelaria in Bogotá, Colombia. Laid out on the San Francisco River, the Environmental Axis of the city is currently established there.

It extends over 2.8 km (1.7 mi) from Teleférico de Monserrate to Monserrate, taking the source of the environmental axis in Carrera 1.ª, going down through the Iglesia de Las Aguas to Carrera 3ª, where it crosses the Las Aguas TransMilenio station, crossing the city center to the west, to Avenida Caracas, where it becomes Avenida Centenario.

== History ==
During the first years of its foundation, the city of Bogotá established the Vicachá river as its northern limit, a Chibcha indigenous denomination that means "The glow of the night", which was later called San Francisco due to the establishment of the Franciscan convent and the Church of San Francisco on its right bank on the "Camino de la Sal" in 1550.

Currently the Church of San Francisco is the oldest church in Bogotá. During the 18th and 19th centuries, the ronda del río was the boundary between the parishes of San Pedro, Nuestra Señora de Las Nieves and San Victorino.

=== Bridges ===
In 1551, the first bridge over the San Francisco River was built, known as the San Miguel Bridge, which connected the Church of San Francisco with the rest of the city. This bridge was a wooden construction that was made during the government of the oidor Juan de Montaño. After a few years it was destroyed by the river bed, for which reason in 1602, a new stone bridge was built.

As the city grew, new bridges were built over it.
