= Usme (disambiguation) =

Usme may refer to:

- Usme, southern locality of Bogotá, Colombia
- Usme Fault, seismic fault named after Usme
- Usme Formation, geologic formation outcropping in Usme
- Usme Synclinal, the valley of the Tunjuelo River
- Portal de Usme (TransMilenio), transport terminal of the TransMilenio, Bogotá
- Catalina Usme, Colombian footballer
