= Vianí Fault =

Geological fracture in the Colombian Andes, South America

- Falla de Vianí
- Location within Colombia
- Etymology: Vianí
- Coordinates: 04°52′37.4″N 74°33′23.6″W
- Country: Colombia
- Region: Andean
- State: Cundinamarca
- Cities: Vianí

Characteristics
- Range: Eastern Ranges, Andes
- Part of: Andean thrust faults
- Length: 38.3 km (23.8 mi)
- Strike: 055.5 ± 15
- Dip: Southeast
- Dip angle: Low to medium
- Displacement: 0.1–1 mm (0.0039–0.0394 in)/yr

Tectonics
- Plate: North Andean
- Status: Inactive
- Type: Oblique thrust fault
- Movement: Dextral reverse
- Age: Quaternary
- Orogeny: Andean

The Vianí Fault (Spanish: Falla de Vianí) is a dextral oblique thrust fault in the department of Cundinamarca in central Colombia. The fault has a total length of 38.3 kilometres (23.8 mi) and runs along an average northwest to southeast strike of 055.5 ± 15 in the Eastern Ranges of the Colombian Andes.

== Etymology ==
The fault is named after Vianí, Cundinamarca.

== Description ==
The Vianí Fault is located on the western slope of the Eastern Ranges of the Colombian Andes. The fault places Lower Cretaceous rocks of the Villeta Group (Trincheras, Simijaca, Hiló and Capotes Formations), to the northwest against Upper Cretaceous rocks of the Güagüaquí Group to the southeast. In the southern area of the fault, the north–south oriented Vianí Fault thrusts the Seca Formation on top of the Hoyón Formation. Farther to the north at Vianí, the fault strike changes to northeast–southwest and the fault displaces the Bituima Fault. The fault trace is characterised by offset spurs, degraded fault scarps, saddles, small pull-apart basins, aligned drainage, and deflected streams. The fault borders the Guaduas Synclinal to the east and south. It forms the northwestern boundary of the Bogotá savanna.

A maximum moment magnitude earthquake is estimated to be 7.2 on the basis of probable rupture of entire fault length. The slip rate is estimated at 0.1 to 1 millimetre (0.0039 to 0.0394 in) per year based on offset morphologic and neotectonic features.

== See also ==
- List of earthquakes in Colombia
- Bogotá Fault
- Honda Fault
- Ibagué Fault
- Usme Fault
