= Monserrate Sanctuary =

Catholic shrine in Bogotá, Colombia

Coordinates: 4.6052°N 74.0554°W

Basilica Sanctuary of the Fallen Lord and Our Lady of Monserrate
- Basílica Santuario del Señor Caído y Nuestra Señora de Monserrate
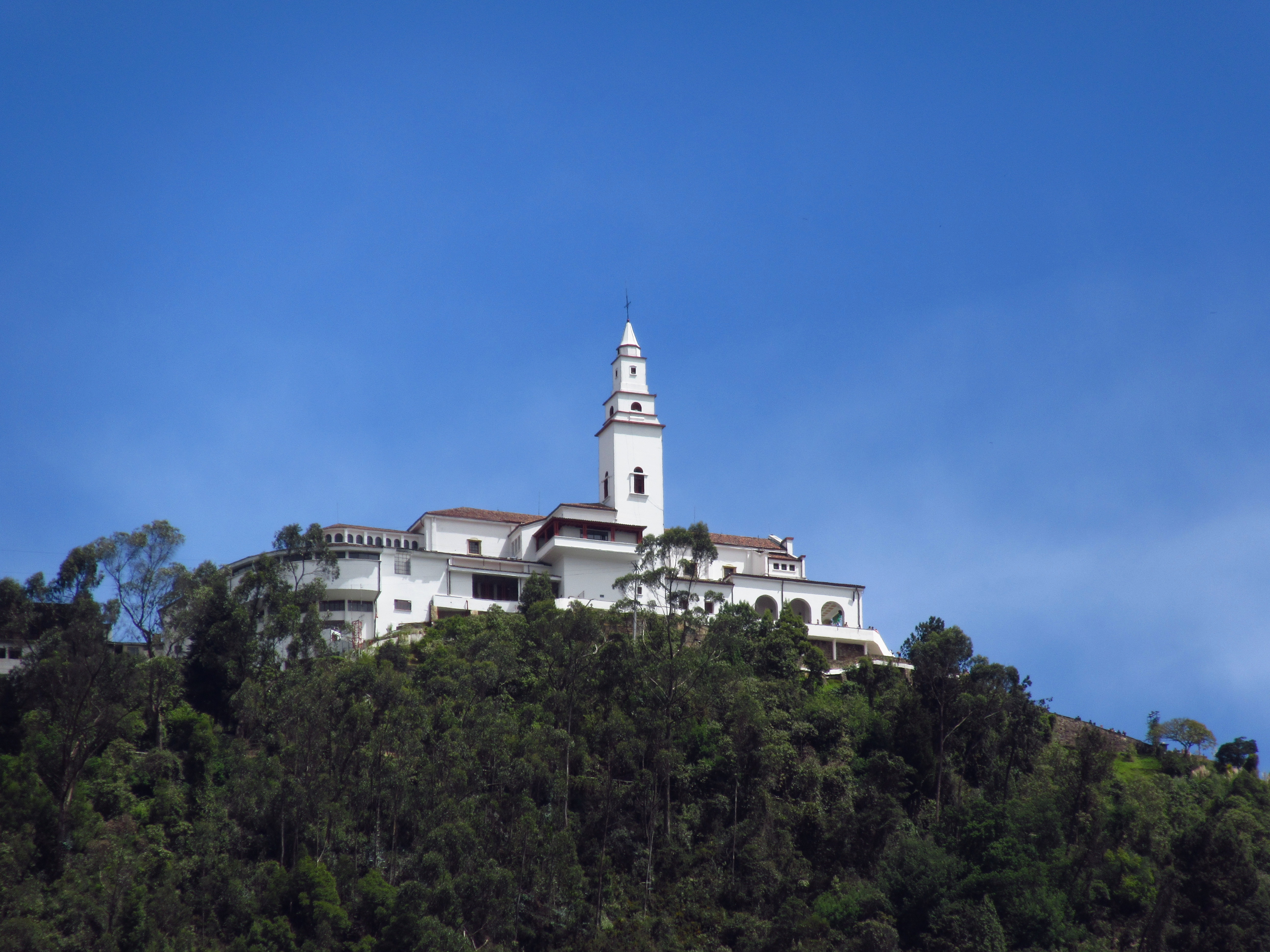
- Monserrate Sanctuary.

Religion
- Affiliation: Roman Catholic
- Diocese: Archdiocese of Bogotá
- Ecclesiastical or organizational status: Minor basilica

Location
- Location: Bogotá, Colombia
- Interactive map of Basilica Sanctuary of the Fallen Lord and Our Lady of Monserrate

Architecture
- Architect: Fray Domingo Petres
- Type: Church
- Style: Neocolonialism
- Completed: 1899

Website
- https://monserrate.co/

Monserrate Sanctuary is a Catholic shrine in Bogotá, Colombia. The sanctuary was built between 1650 and 1657 and is 3,152 metres (10,341 ft) above sea level.

== See also ==
- Guadalupe Hill, another prominent hill above Bogotá, on top of which is a statue of Our Lady of Guadalupe
- Monserrate, the mountain on which the church is located
