= San Francisco River (Bogotá) =

River in Colombia

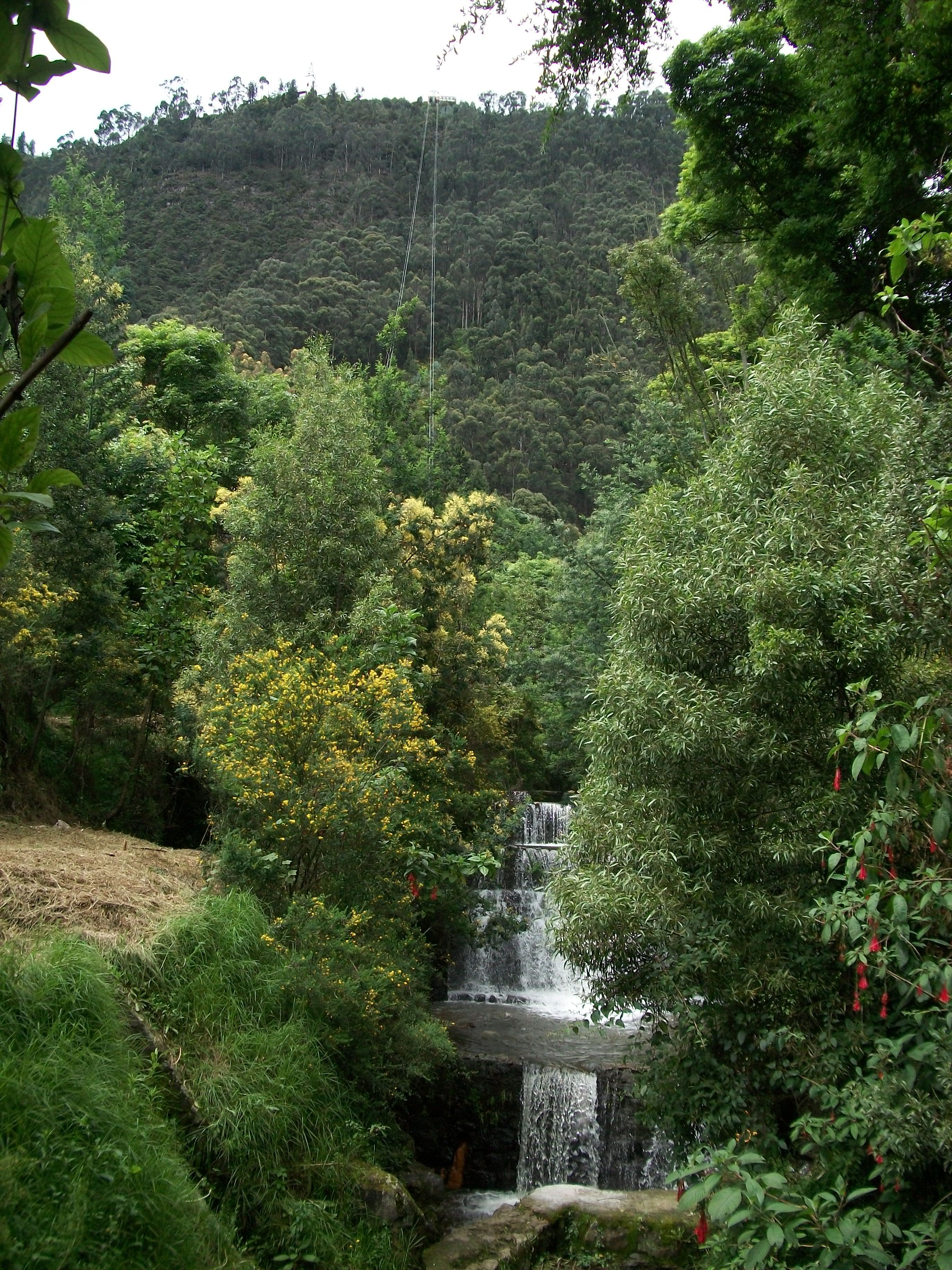
- San Francisco River in Bogotá, near the Quinta de Bolívar.

- Mouth location in Colombia
- Native name: Río San Francisco (Spanish)

Location
- Country: Colombia

Physical characteristics
- Source
  - location: Páramo de Cruz Verde
  - elevation: 2,640 m (8,660 ft)
- Mouth
  - location: Fucha River
- Length: 10 km (6.2 mi)

The San Francisco River (Spanish: Río San Francisco) is a river that crosses the Bogotá savanna from east to west and is closely related to the history of the city. This marked the northern limit of Bogotá in its years of colonial foundation. It originates in the Páramo de Cruz Verde and descends from the Monserrate hill. Upon reaching the city, it is channeled. In Avenida Jiménez with Sixth street, it converges underground with the San Agustín River.

== History ==
Originally, the San Francisco River was known by the indigenous peoples who inhabited the Bogotá savannah as the Vicachá River, which means "The glow of the night". It was the largest river in the region and during its first centuries, it supplied the entire city with water, serving its course as the southern limit of the parish of Las Nieves.

With the establishment of the Franciscan religious community in 1550 and the construction of the Church of San Francisco on the north bank, the Vicachá River would adopt the name of San Francisco. During the 1930s the river was canalized and Avenida Jiménez was established in its place. Between 1999 and 2001, the Environmental Axis was built, recovering a fragment of its original layout.

== See also ==
- List of rivers of Colombia
