= Bogotá Fault =

Major inactive slightly dextral oblique thrust fault in Colombia

- Falla de Bogotá
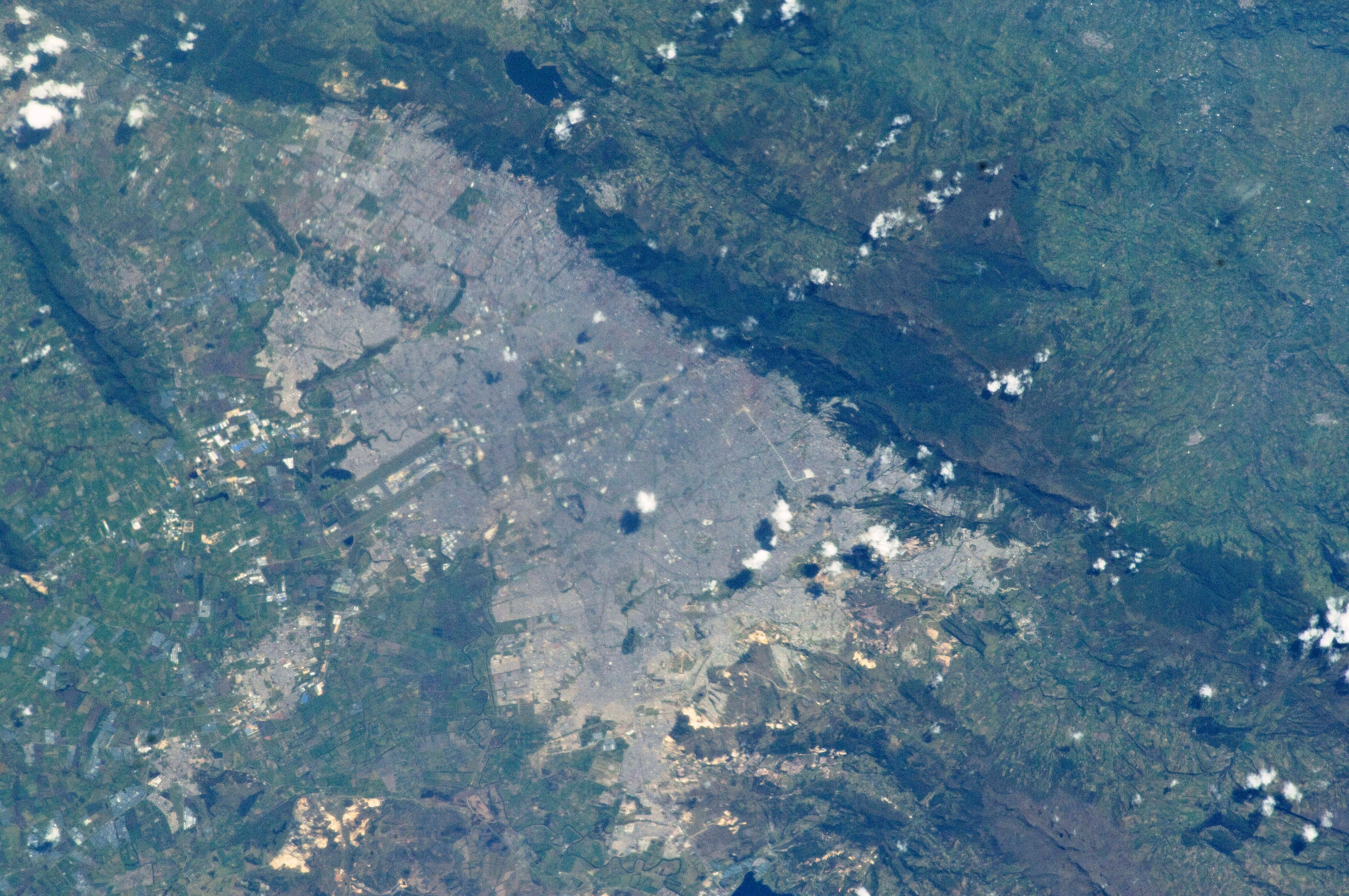
- The Bogotá Fault borders the Colombian capital to the east; bottom right to top left here

- Location within Colombia
- Etymology: Bogotá
- Named by: Clements
- Year defined: 1940
- Coordinates: 4°37′25″N 74°03′11″W
- Country: Colombia
- Region: Andean
- State: Cundinamarca
- Cities: Bogotá, La Calera

Characteristics
- Elevation: 2,600–3,800 m (8,500–12,500 ft)
- Range: Altiplano Cundiboyacense; Eastern Ranges, Andes
- Part of: Andean thrust faults
- Length: 79.3–107 km (49.3–66.5 mi)
- Width: 10–20 m (33–66 ft)
- Strike: 013.5 ± 7
- Dip: East
- Dip angle: 15-25
- Displacement: Vertical: 760 metres (2,490 ft); Slip rate: 0.01–0.1 mm (0.00039–0.00394 in)/yr

Tectonics
- Plate: North Andean
- Status: Inactive
- Earthquakes: Prehistorical
- Type: Slightly oblique thrust fault
- Movement: Dextral reverse
- Rock units: Hanging wall: Guadalupe Gp., Chipaque Fm. Footwall: Guaduas Fm., Cacho Fm., Bogotá Fm.
- Age: Pleistocene (<1.6 Ma)
- Orogeny: Andean

The Bogotá Fault (Spanish: Falla de Bogotá) is a major inactive slightly dextral oblique thrust fault in the department of Cundinamarca in central Colombia. The fault has a total length of 79.3 kilometres (49.3 mi), while other authors designate a length of 107 kilometres (66 mi), and runs along an average north-northeast to south-southwest strike of 013.5 ± 7 across the Altiplano Cundiboyacense, central part of the Eastern Ranges of the Colombian Andes.

The fault stretches from the Gallo River at the Sumapaz Páramo in the south to the Teusacá River in the north and borders the Bogotá savanna and the Colombian capital to the east. The Bogotá Fault formed the pronounced Eastern Hills, with the well-known Monserrate and Guadalupe Hills, east of the Colombian capital. The brecciated fault zone is exposed along the road from Bogotá to La Calera and a vertical displacement of at least 760 metres (2,490 ft) has been determined. The hanging wall of the reverse fault contains the Late Cretaceous Chipaque Formation and Guadalupe Group and the footwall consists of the Paleogene and Neogene Guaduas, Cacho and Bogotá Formations.

Pulsations of the fault movement in the early Quaternary have produced the alluvial fans of the Tunjuelo Formation. In part, the fault is covered by Late Pleistocene deposits of the Sabana Formation showing a pre-Holocene activity with no known historical seismicity or registered damages. The present slip rate of the Bogotá Fault is established at 0.01 to 0.1 millimetres (0.00039 to 0.00394 in) per year.

== Etymology ==
The fault is named after Bogotá, Cundinamarca by Thomas Clements, who performed the first study on the fault in 1940.

== Description ==
The southeastern part of the Bogotá savanna is bound by the Bogotá Fault

The Bogotá Fault extends across the Altiplano Cundiboyacense along the base of the mountain front that borders the flatlands known as the Bogotá savanna, to the east bordering the Bogotá Anticlinal for 23 kilometres (14 mi). The fault follows the longitudinal axis of the Eastern Hills, striking north-northeast to south-southwest at 013.5 ± 7 and dipping 15-25 degrees to the east. It forms the tectonic limit with the Bogotá savanna and acts as a barrier for aquifers. The fault runs parallel to the Usme Fault.

The tectonic regime of the Neogene and Quaternary is the result of the interaction of four tectonic plates; the Malpelo Plate in the west, the Caribbean Plate in the north, the South American Plate in the east and the North Andes Plate where the Altiplano Cundiboyacense is located. The compressional tectonics of the Andean orogeny thrusted the Cretaceous units of the Guadalupe Group and Chipaque Formation on top of the younger Guaduas, Cacho and Bogotá Formations. The timing of the recent Andean uplift was Pleistocene, concluded on the basis of apatite fission track analysis by structural geologist Andrés Mora. The Late Cretaceous units of the hanging wall are folded producing the Bogotá Anticlinal, and showing a vertical stratigraphic displacement of at least 760 metres (2,490 ft). The Sabana Formation, named after the Bogotá savanna were deposited in the Pleistocene paleolake Lake Humboldt, of which the many wetlands and the Bogotá River are the present-day remainders.

The fault mainly cuts Cretaceous and Tertiary sedimentary rocks and, to some extent, early Quaternary deposits. The fault produces strong slope changes between different geologic units on both sides of the fault plane and displays degraded fault scarps, especially the well-known Monserrate, the location where the fault was first studied. The brecciated zone of the fault has a width between 10 and 20 metres (33 and 66 ft). The brecciated area of the fault is well exposed along the road from Bogotá to La Calera, north of Calle 85 in the capital. At the entrance to the cable car going up to Monserrate, the fault shows reverse and normal offset faults and produced fractures in the shales (Plaeners Formation) of the Guadalupe Group. The alluvial fans of the Tunjuelo Formation were produced by the seismic pulses of the Bogotá Fault.

== Activity ==
The Bogotá Fault was first analyzed by Thomas Clements in 1940, and he concluded the fault was still active. However, later studies have shown the fault does not displace younger Quaternary deposits and is hence determined being inactive. No known historical earthquakes have been produced by the fault, and recent seismic activity has not been registered. The Bogotá Fault crosscuts the Rosales tunnel where no damages have been noted. A slip rate of 0.01 to 0.1 millimetres (0.00039 to 0.00394 in) per year is calculated from displaced geomorphologic Quaternary features.

== Gallery ==
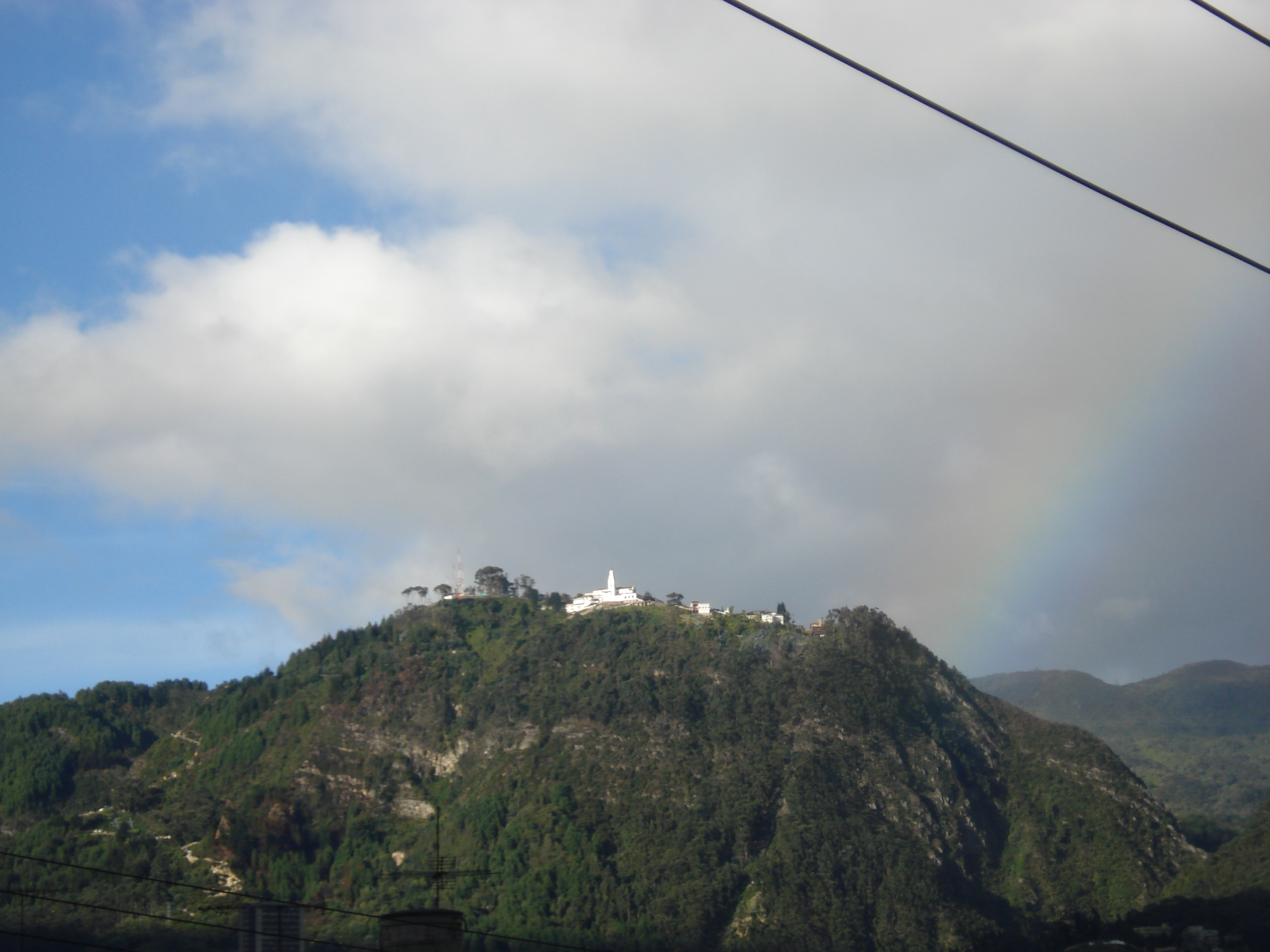
Monserrate Hill was formed by the Bogotá Fault

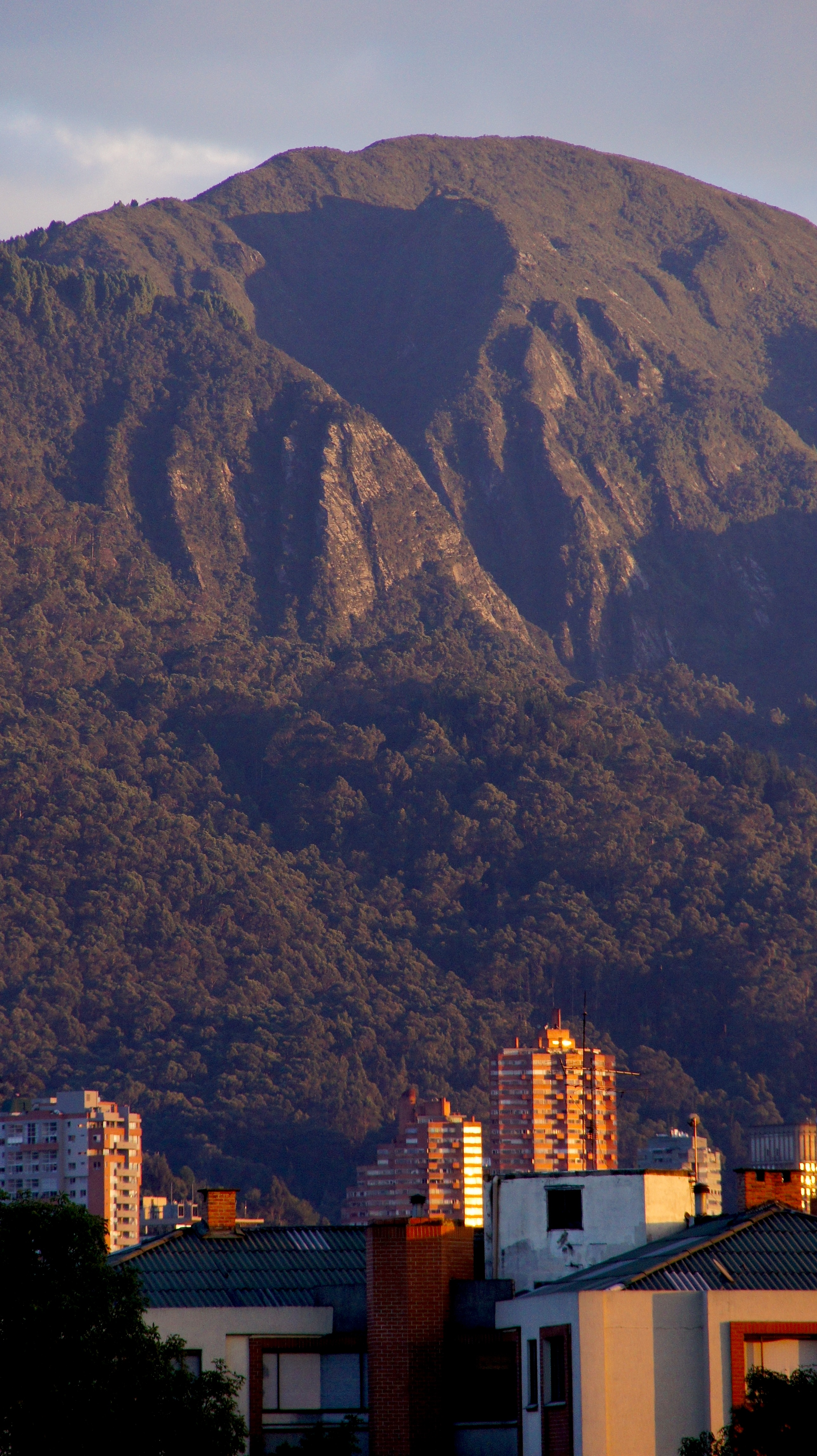
Fault scarps at Cerro Aguanoso

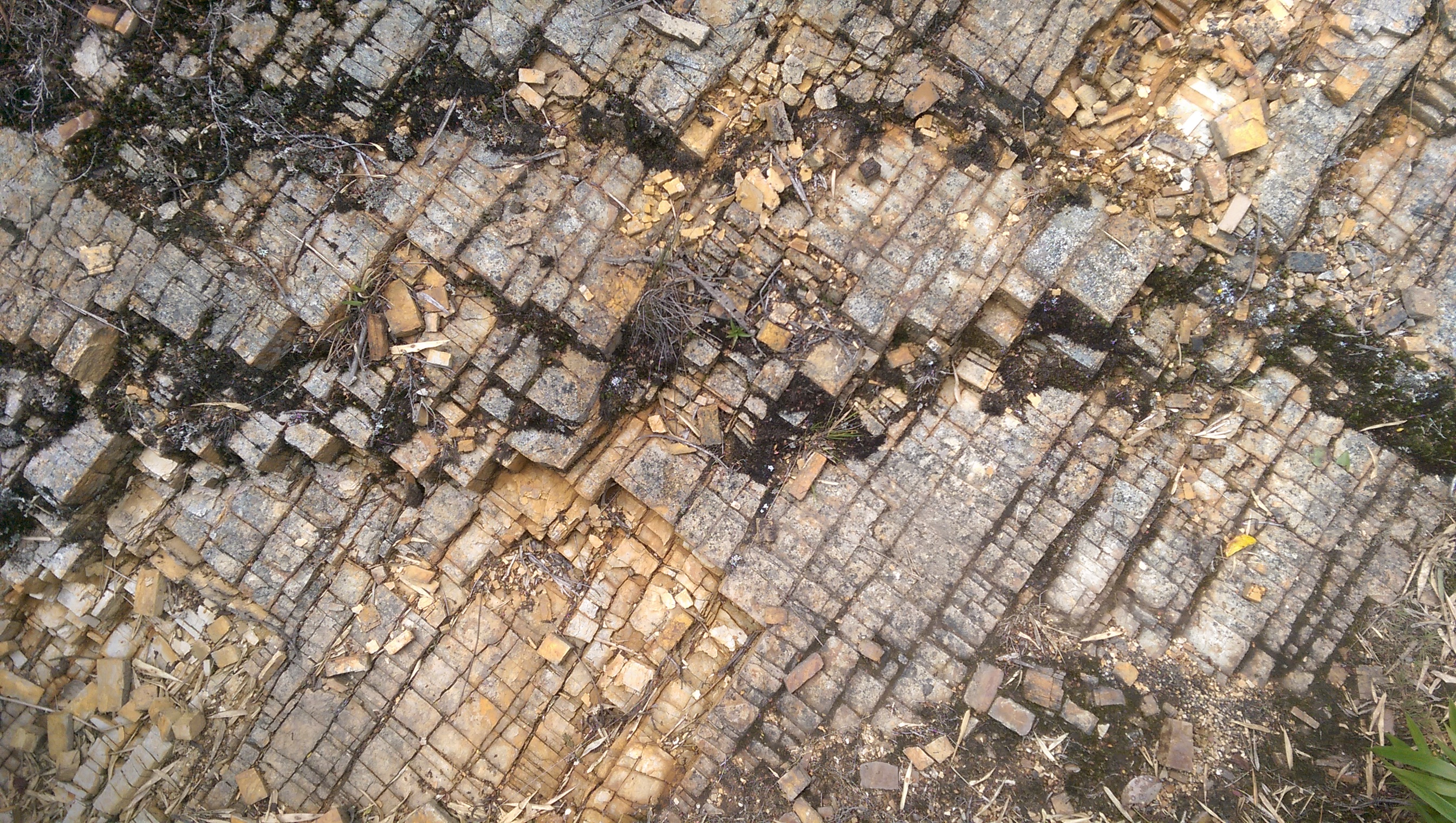
Intense fracturing in the Guadalupe Group

== See also ==
- List of earthquakes in Colombia
- Bucaramanga-Santa Marta Fault
- Eastern Frontal Fault System
- Usme Fault
- Vianí Fault
