= Teleférico de Monserrate =

Tourist cable car in Bogotá

Coordinates: 4°36′11″N 74°03′40″W

- Teleférico de Monserrate
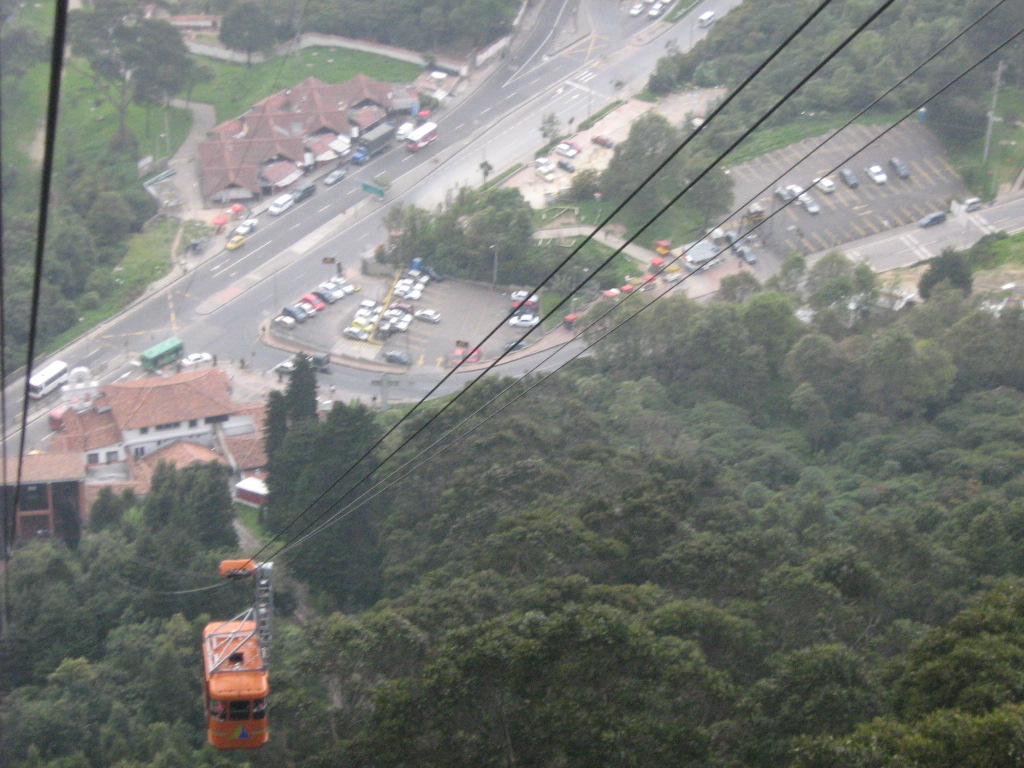
- Monserrate Aerial tramway
- Interactive map of Teleférico de Monserrate

Overview
- Status: Operational
- Location: Bogotá
- Country: Colombia
- Termini: Ticket office Monserrate Hill
- No. of stations: 2
- Open: September 27, 1955; 70 years ago

The Teleférico de Monserrate is a tourist cable car that connects Bogotá with the Monserrate hill.

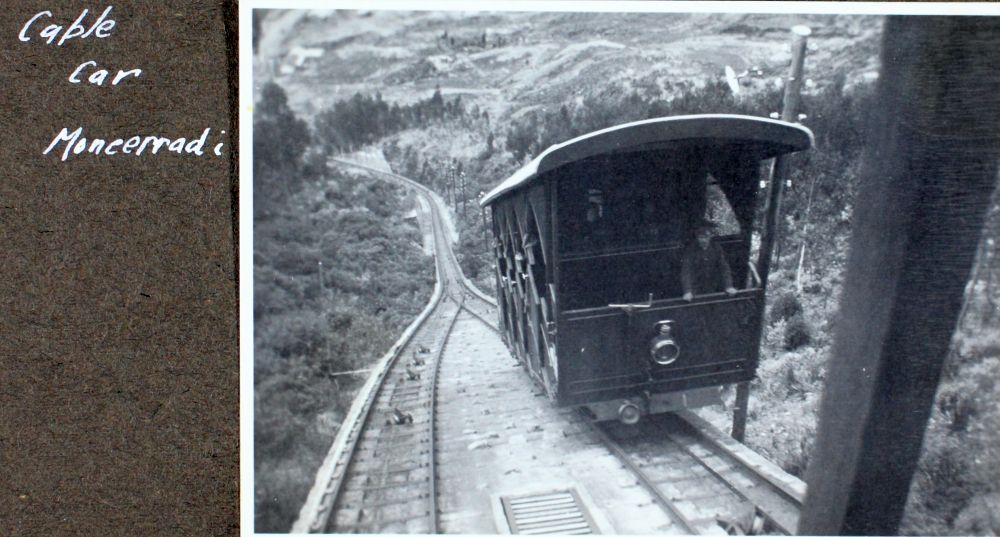
The cable car used to transport people up Monserrate (c. early 20th century)

== History ==
The cable car to Monserrate was built to provide service to the increasing number of parishioners who ascended to the Basilica del Señor de Monserrate in the 1950s, when the only means of ascent was the funicular train, or pulled train.

Designed by the Swiss Von Roll company, its construction began in 1953 and it was commissioned on September 27, 1955. When it was finished, the total cost of the work amounted to one million pesos. At that time a peso bought a dollar.

The equipment used today to manage the system is in perfect condition, and has also been updated and modernized. The action boards, monitoring and security systems are fully computerized, which makes it one of the most modern systems in the world.

Over the years the cable car has changed in color and appearance. At first it was white, then it was painted yellow, then red and green, later red, now it is orange.

== Current system ==
The cable car takes four minutes to travel the 820 meters (2,690 ft) between the station of the ring road with Calle 26 up to 3,152 meters (10,341 ft), at the station on the hill.

== See also ==
- List of aerial tramways
