= Vianí =

- Municipality and town
- Flag Coat of arms

- Location of the municipality and town inside Cundinamarca Department of Colombia

- Location in Colombia
- Coordinates: 4°52′26″N 74°33′46″W
- Country: Colombia
- Department: Cundinamarca
- Elevation: 1,498 m (4,915 ft)
- Time zone: UTC-5 (Colombia Standard Time)
- Website: Official website

Vianí is a municipality and town of Colombia in the department of Cundinamarca.
