= Usme Fault =

- Falla de Usme
- Location within Colombia
- Etymology: Usme
- Coordinates: 04°20′03.9″N 74°12′11.2″W
- Country: Colombia
- Region: Andean
- State: Cundinamarca
- Cities: Bogotá

Characteristics
- Range: Eastern Ranges, Andes
- Part of: Andean oblique faults
- Length: 64.9 km (40.3 mi)
- Strike: 022.7 ± 6
- Dip: East
- Dip angle: High
- Displacement: 1–5 mm (0.039–0.197 in)/yr

Tectonics
- Plate: North Andean
- Status: Active
- Earthquakes: Possibly historic
- Type: Oblique normal fault
- Movement: Dextral
- Age: Quaternary
- Orogeny: Andean

The Usme Fault (Spanish: Falla de Usme) is a dextral oblique normal fault in the department of Cundinamarca in central Colombia. The fault has a total length of 64.9 kilometres (40.3 mi) and runs along an average north-northeast to south-southwest strike of 022.7 ± 6 in the Eastern Ranges of the Colombian Andes.

== Etymology ==
The fault is named after Usme, southern locality of the Colombian capital Bogotá.

== Description ==
The Usme Fault is located in the Eastern Ranges of the Colombian Andes, south of Bogotá and extends along the western margin of the Tunjuelo River valley. The fault underlies the Sumapaz Páramo. The fault displaces Cretaceous and Tertiary rocks as well as Quaternary alluvial and glacial (moraine) deposits.

The fault valley shows features suggesting a half-graben with a steep slope wall on the west and low-angle slope on the east. The fault forms a steep, prominent circa 40 metres (130 ft) high east-facing scarp on Cretaceous rocks that show initial development of triangular facets. The hanging valleys have Quaternary alluvial deposits on the western uplifted block. The scarp forms the western wall of a narrow and long valley. To the south of Bogotá, it appears that Pleistocene moraines are offset as recorded by east-facing well-preserved scarps about 3 metres (9.8 ft) high.

== See also ==
- List of earthquakes in Colombia
- Bogotá Fault
- Vianí Fault
- Eastern Frontal Fault System
