= Guadalupe Hill =

Hill in Colombia

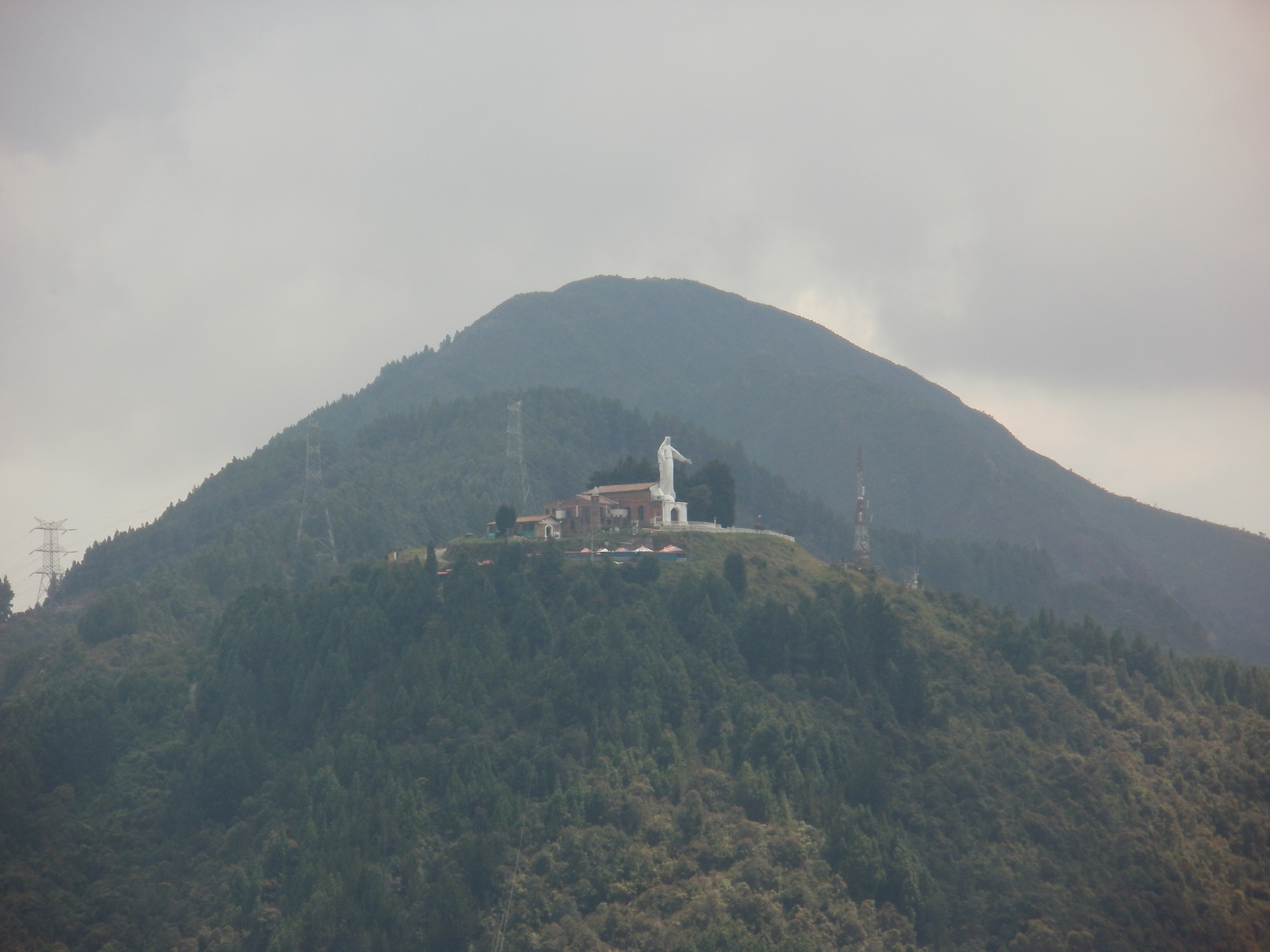
- Guadalupe Hill seen from Monserrate

Highest point
- Elevation: 3,360 m (11,020 ft)
- Coordinates: 4°35′31″N 74°03′15″W

Naming
- Native name: Cerro de Guadalupe (Spanish)

Geography
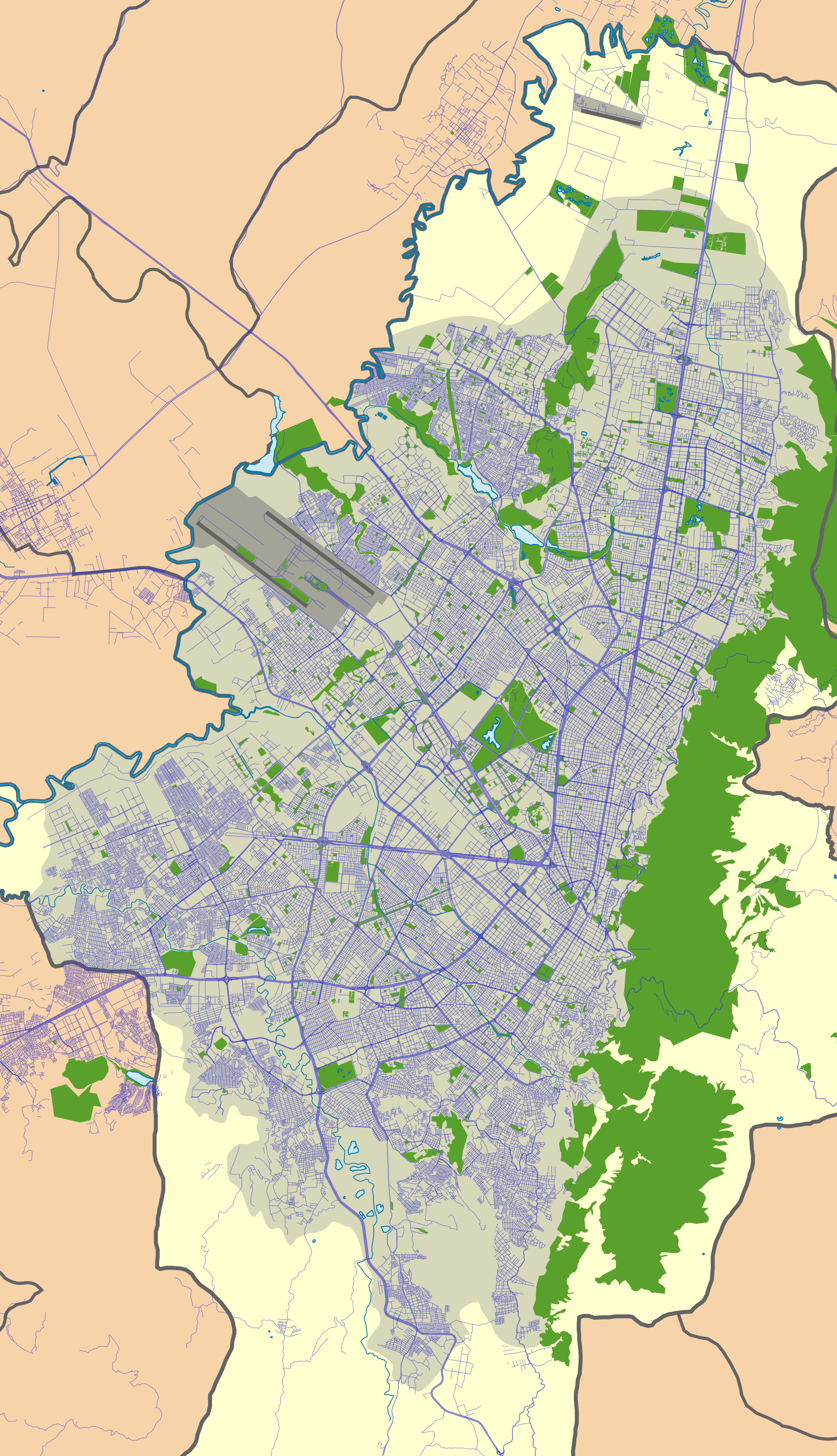
- Location within Bogotá
- City: Bogotá, Colombia
- Parent range: Eastern Hills; Altiplano Cundiboyacense; Eastern Ranges; Andes

Geology
- Rock age(s): Guadalupe Group (type locality); Campanian-Maastrichtian
- Mountain type: Thrusted mountain

Climbing
- First ascent: Pre-Columbian era
- Easiest route: Pilgrimage trail Avenida Circunvalar→Road to Choachí

Guadalupe Hill is a 3,360-metre (11,020 ft) high hill located in the Eastern Hills, uphill from the centre of Bogotá, Colombia. Together with its neighbouring hill Monserrate it is one of the landmarks of Bogotá. At the top of the hill a hermitage and a 15-metre (49 ft) high statue has been erected. The statue was elaborated by sculptor Gustavo Arcila Uribe in 1946 and is accompanied by a chapel dedicated to Our Lady of Guadalupe.

Guadalupe Hill is the type locality of the Guadalupe Group, a Late Cretaceous sedimentary sequence of sandstones and shales of 750 metres (2,460 ft) thick. The formation is being thrust on top of younger strata by the reverse Bogotá Fault as a result of the ongoing Andean orogeny. The hill is the source for the Manzanares and El Chuscal creeks that flow westwards onto the Bogotá savanna.

Historically, Guadalupe Hill was an important sacred site for the indigenous Muisca, who inhabited the Bogotá savanna and surrounding regions before the Spanish conquest. During the colonial period, Guadalupe Hill contained a cross and the hermitage that was destroyed by various earthquakes in the eighteenth, nineteenth and twentieth centuries. On Sundays, Guadalupe Hill and its chapel and statue are visited by tourists and pilgrims from Bogotá, accessing the hill either by road and public transport or via a walking trail to the hilltop.

== Etymology ==
Guadalupe Hill is named after Our Lady of Guadalupe of Badajoz, not -as is commonly believed- after the famous Our Lady of Guadalupe in Mexico.

== Geology ==
The Guadalupe Hill is the type locality for the Campanian-Maastrichtian Guadalupe Group, a sequence of three formations of sandstones and shales; Arenisca Dura, Plaeners, Arenisca de Labor and Arenisca Tierna. The thickness of the Guadalupe Group, defined as formation by some authors, at Guadalupe Hill is 750 metres (2,460 ft). Approximately 53% of the Eastern Hills consists of the Guadalupe Group.

The Guadalupe Group is thrust on top of the younger Guaduas, Bogotá and Cacho Formations by the Bogotá Fault. The NNW-SSE trending eastward dipping thrust fault forms a barrier for aquifers. The creeks (quebradas) Manzanares and El Chuscal originate from Guadalupe Hill.

== History ==
Animation of Sué at the December solstice, seen from Bolívar Square rising exactly above Guadalupe Hill

Guadalupe Hill in the times before the Spanish conquest was one of the sacred hilltops in the religion of the Muisca, the indigenous inhabitants of the Bogotá savanna. They considered the hills sacred and buried their dead in the mountains. The people, organised in a loose confederation of leaders, the Muisca Confederation, had an advanced knowledge of archaeoastronomy and constructed various temples honouring Sué, the god of the Sun, throughout their territories. Guadalupe Hill in pre-Columbian times was called in their language Muysccubun quijicha guexica, "grandfather's foot". Seen from Bolívar Square, at the winter solstice of December, Sué rises exactly over Guadalupe Hill and at the equinoxes of March and September in the valley between Monserrate and Guadalupe.

At the time of the conquest, the Eastern Hills were a forested natural boundary of the Bogotá savanna. During the early colonial period, the Spanish constructed a cross on Guadalupe Hill as a symbol to protect the capital of the New Kingdom of Granada. The wood of the trees of the Eastern Hills were used for construction and heating in the city that grew steadily until the 19th century. This led to deforestation and erosion in the Eastern Hills and when Alexander von Humboldt visited Santa Fe de Bogotá in 1806, he noted "that there was not a single tree left until the open area of Choachí". The first replanting of trees took place in 1855, and a second phase of reforestation happened in 1940. In 1801, Francisco José de Caldas recalculated the height of Guadalupe Hill.

=== Hermitage and statue ===
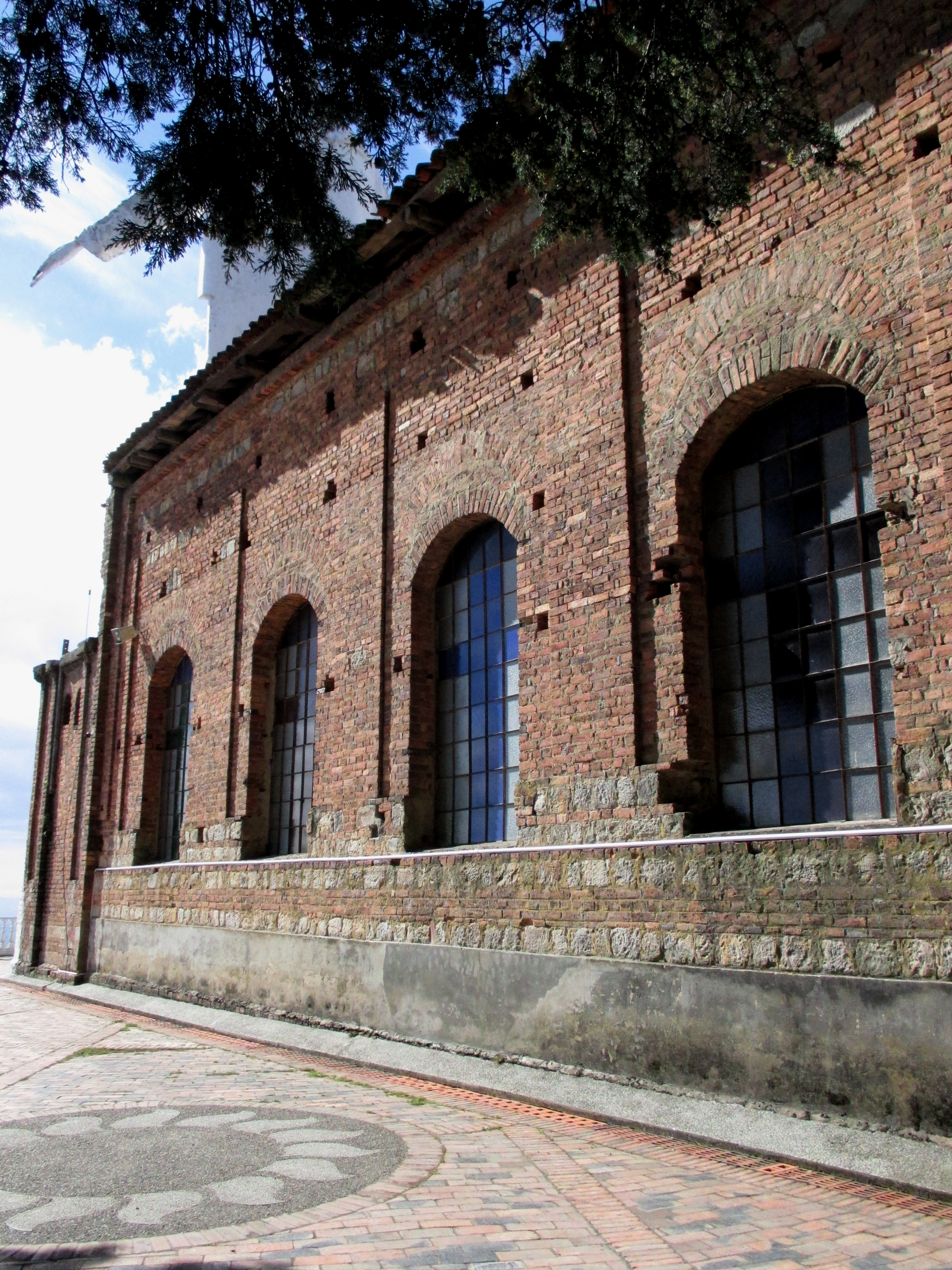
Hermitage

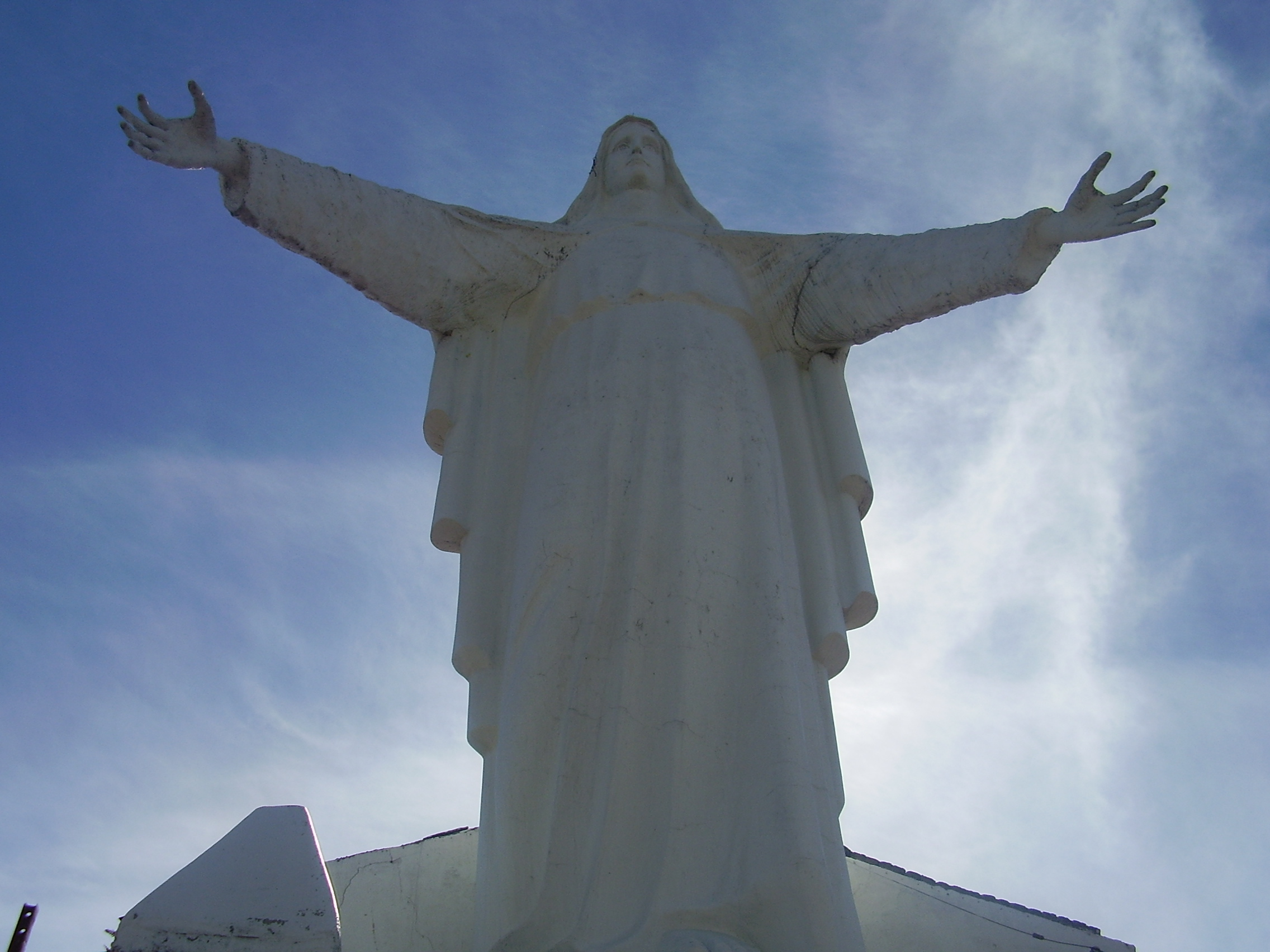
Statue

The hermitage, destroyed by various earthquakes was reconstructed in 1945. One year later, the statue of Our Lady of Guadalupe was added.

The first hermitage on Guadalupe Hill was built in 1656 and blessed during a pilgrimage on September 8 of that year. The hermitage was destroyed by the earthquakes of 1743, 1785 and 1827. During the presidency of Tomás Cipriano de Mosquera, the hermitage was reconstructed, but affected again by the 1917 Bogotá earthquake. The hermitage was rebuilt in 1945 by Jorge Murcia Riaño and blessed by archbishop Ismael Perdomo. In 1946, the 15-metre (49 ft) high statue of the Virgin of Guadalupe, sculpted by Gustavo Arcila Uribe, was constructed on top of Guadalupe Hill. In 1967, the chapel and road leading up to it were constructed.

== Tourism ==
The Guadalupe Hill and the statue of the Virgin of Guadalupe are among the main touristic attractions of Bogotá. The top of the hill offers a viewpoint (mirador) for the Colombian capital. The hill can be accessed via a walking trail, used by pilgrims since colonial times, or by the road to Choachí via the Avenida Circunvalar.

Public transport to Guadalupe Hill leaves on Sundays from Carrera 10 with Calle 6. Since 1997, a running contest is held to ascend the Guadalupe Hill.

Every Sunday, the chapel on the hill receives tourists between 7:00 in the morning and 4:00 in the afternoon. On the first Sundays of the month, a mass is held from 8:00 to 10:00 AM and at noon.

== Gallery ==
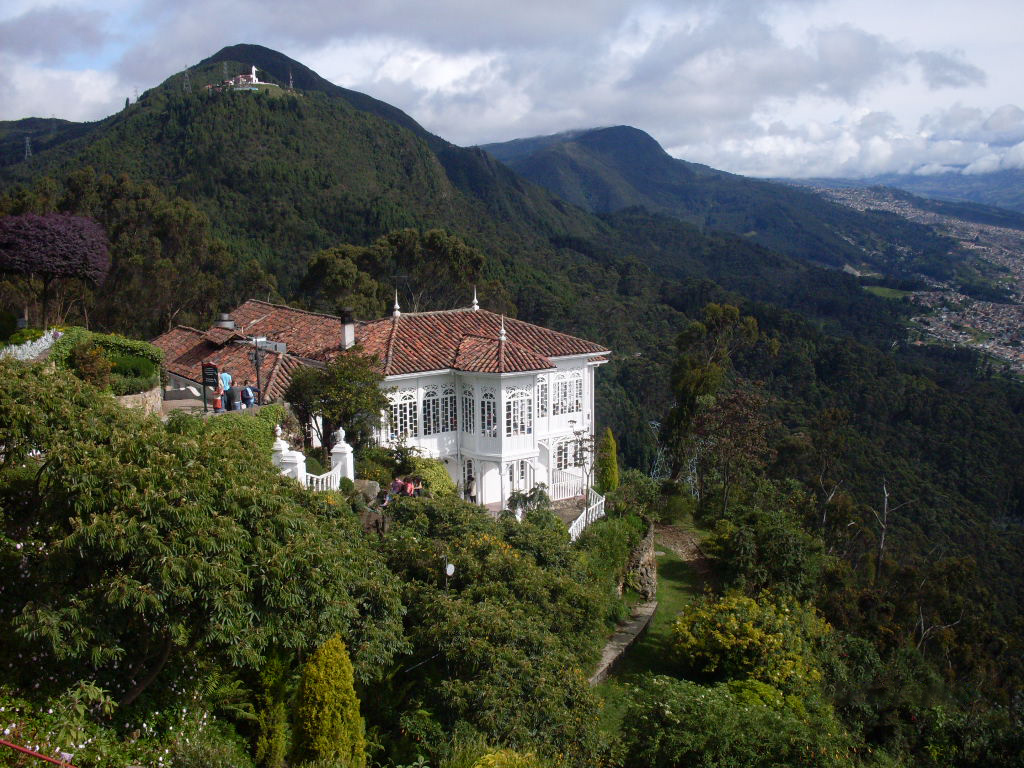
Guadalupe Hill from Monserrate

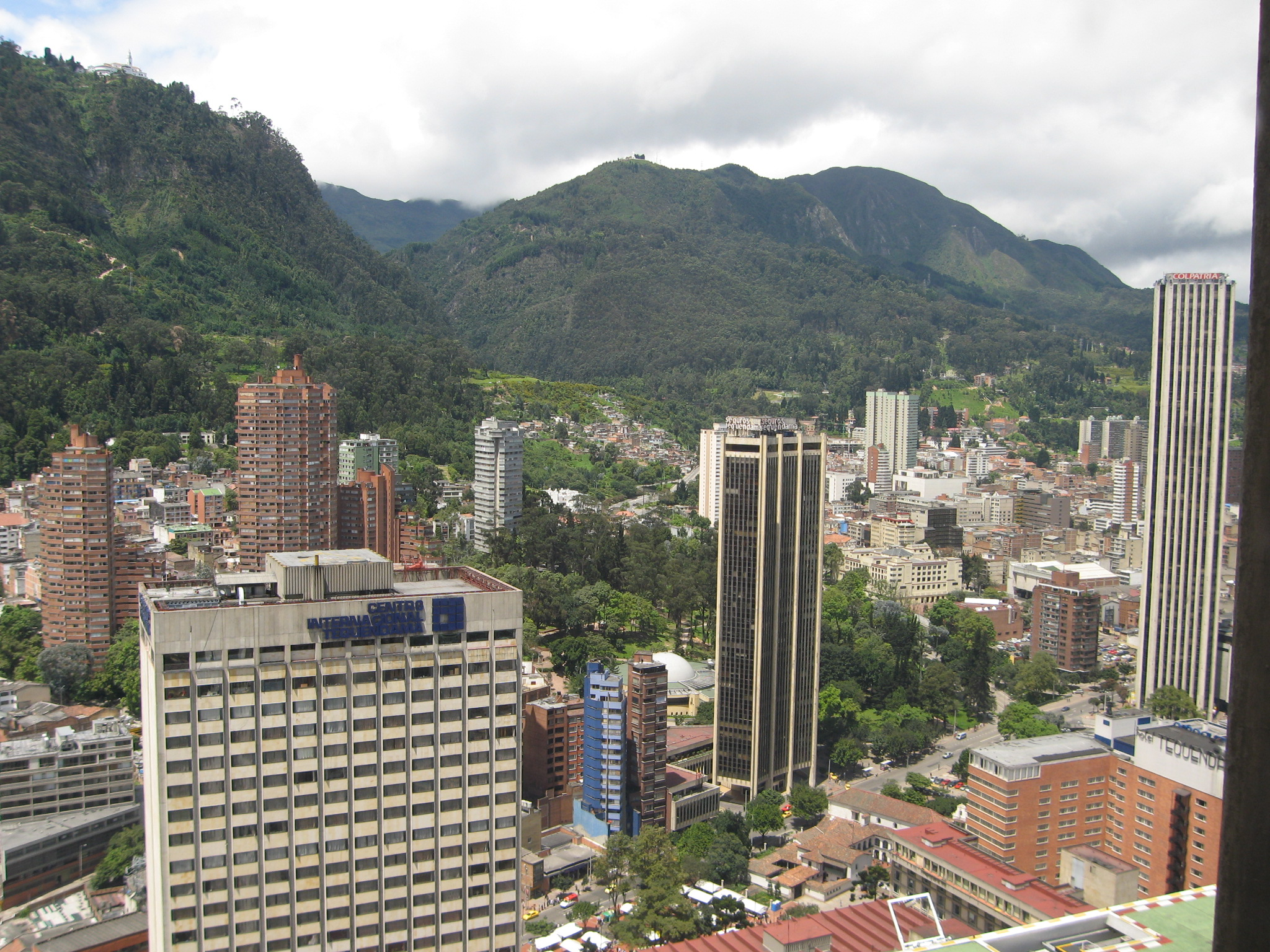
Guadalupe Hill behind the business district of Bogotá

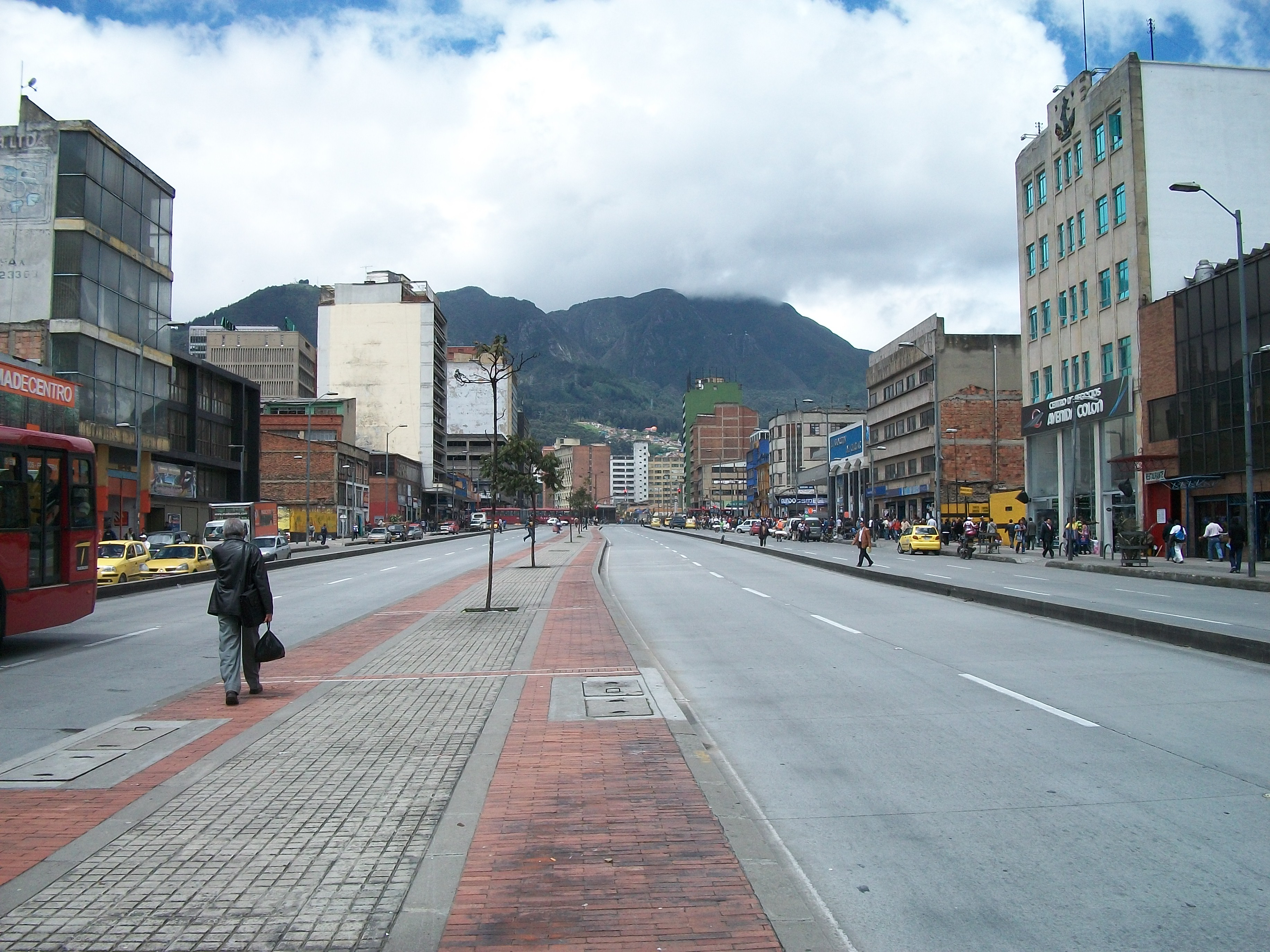
Clouds over Guadalupe Hill
from Avenida Jiménez

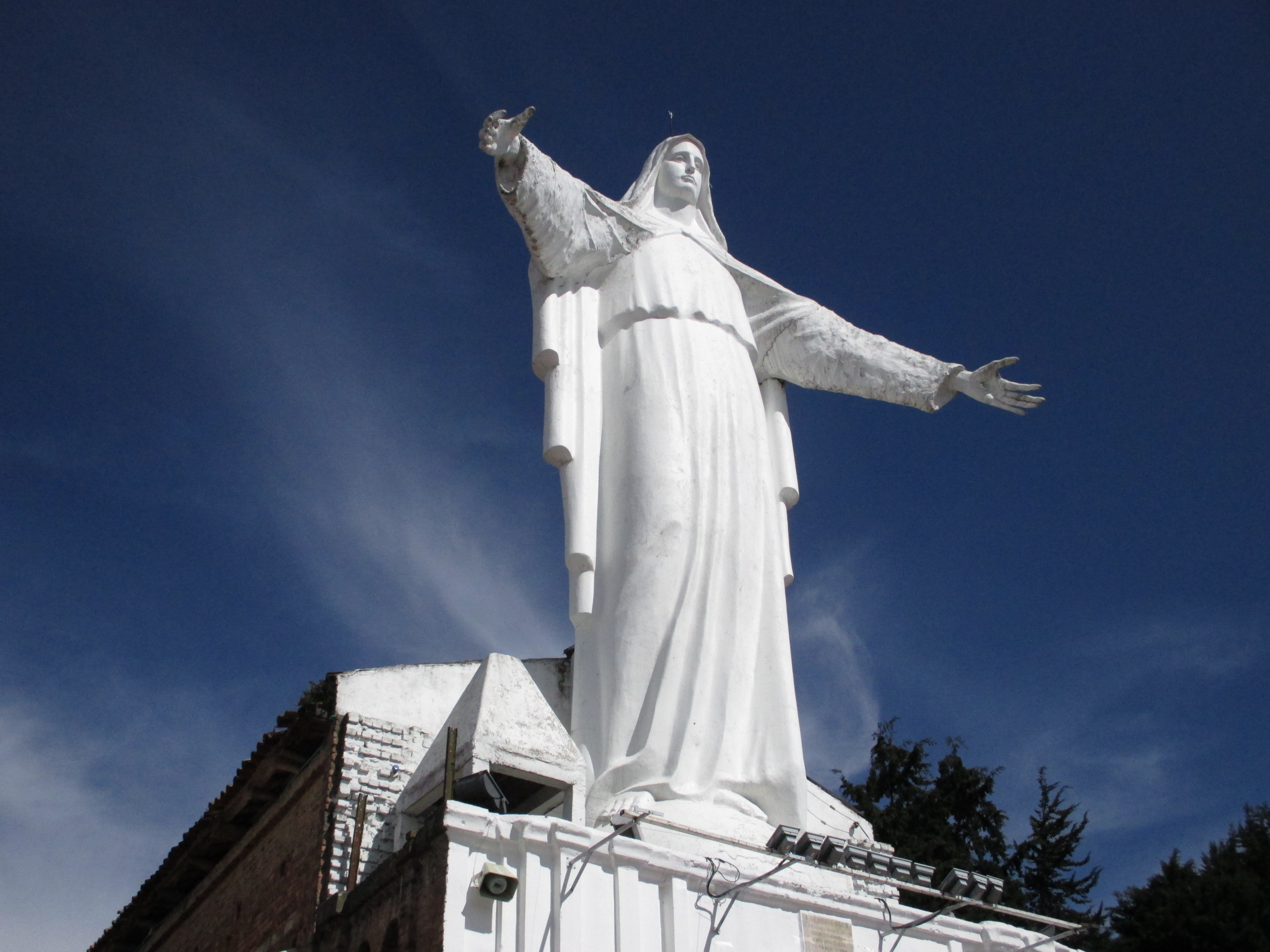
Our Lady of Guadalupe statue

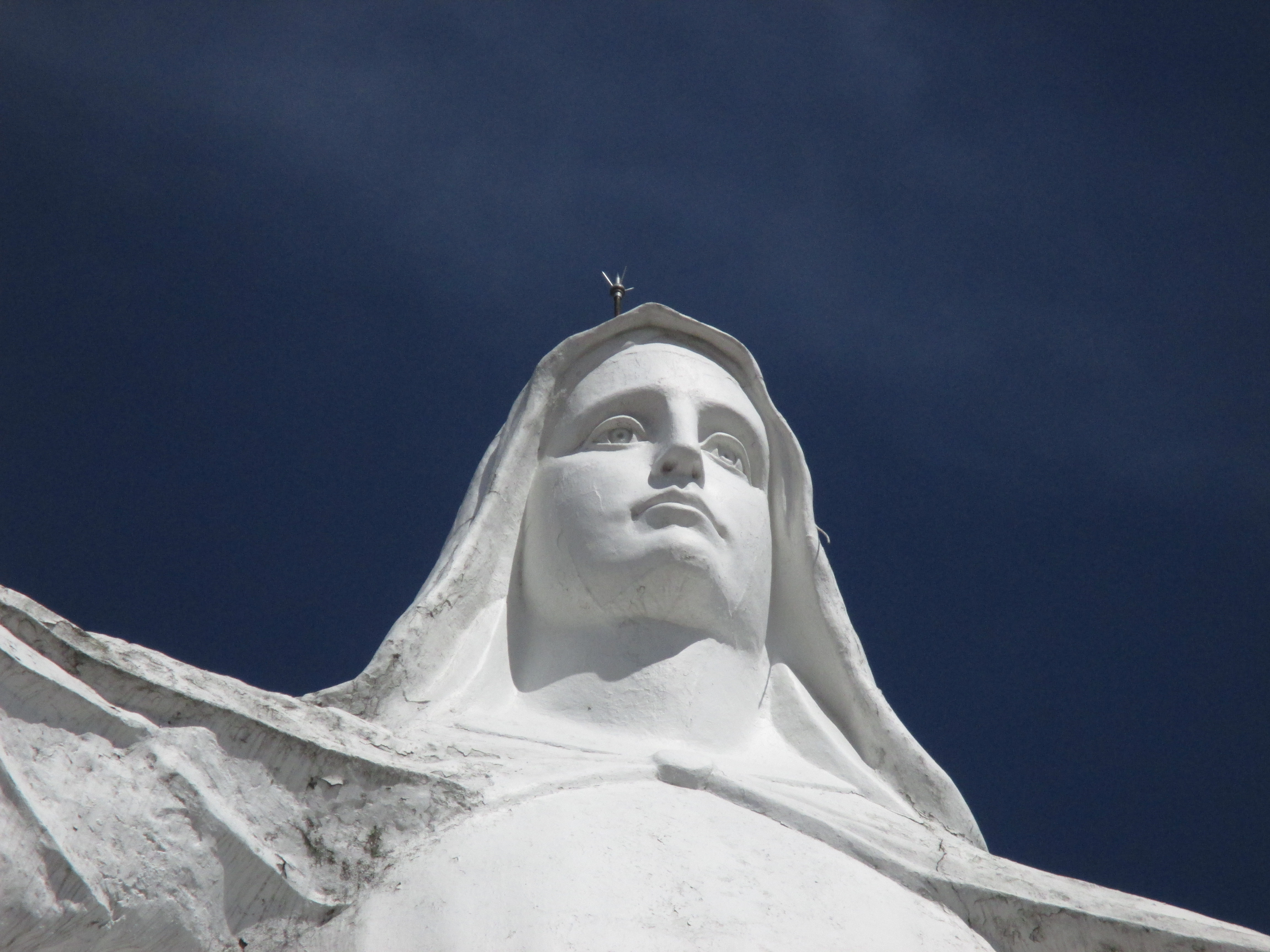
Head of the statue

== See also ==
- Eastern Hills, Bogotá
- Bogotá savanna
