= Hotel Tequendama =

Hotel in Bogotá, Colombia

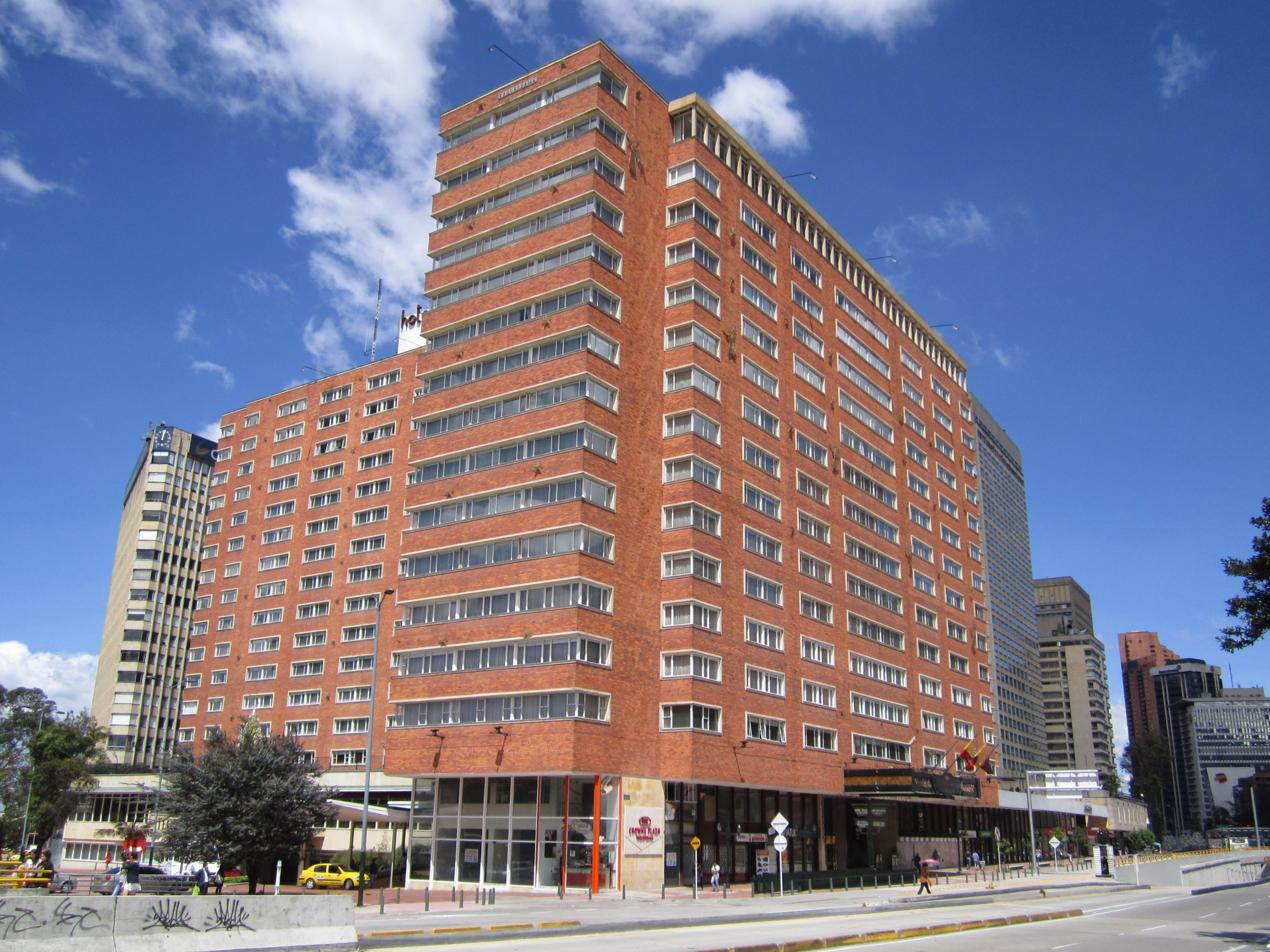

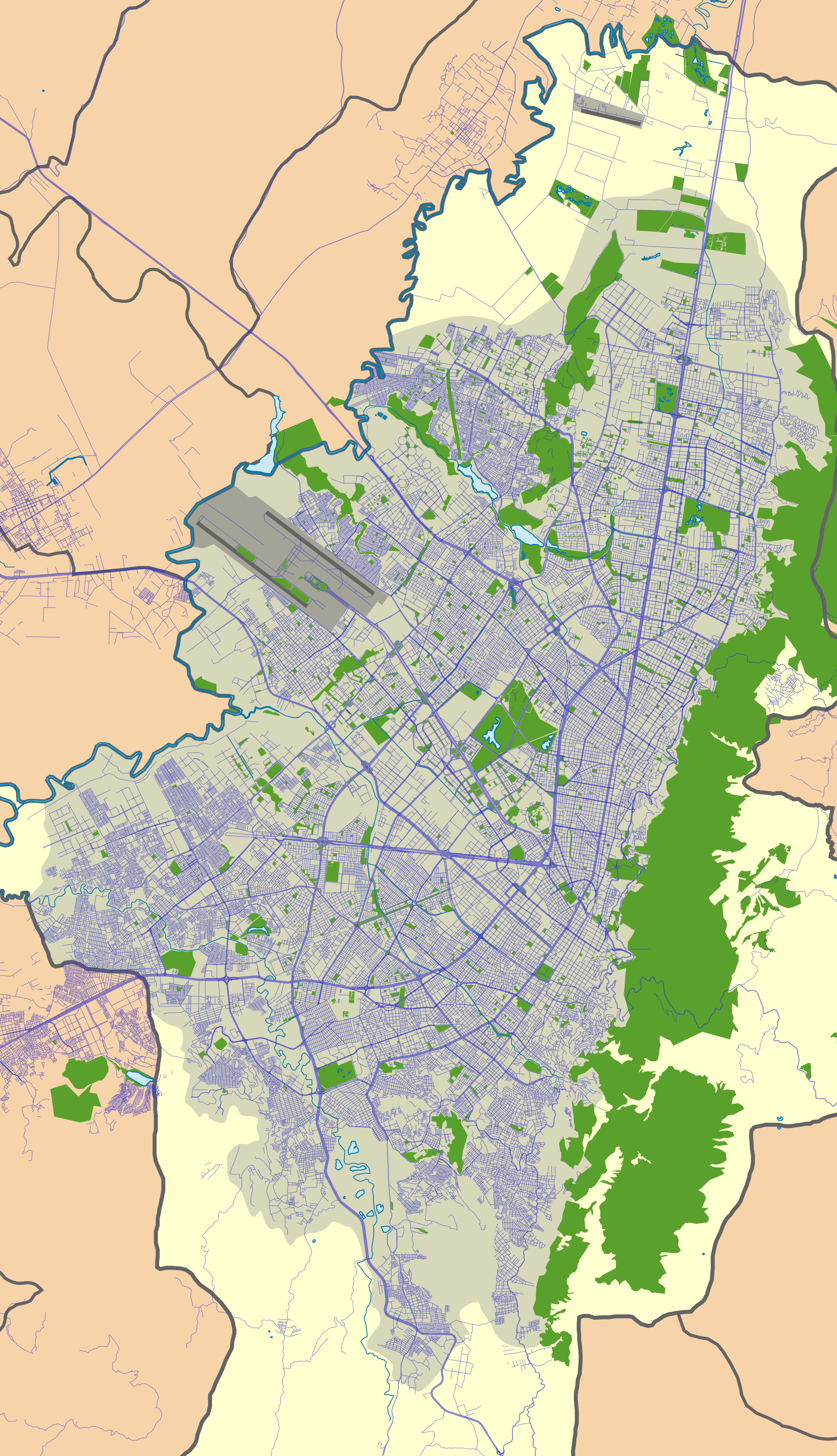
- Location within Bogotá

General information
- Status: In use
- Location: Carrera 10 #26-21, Bogotá, Colombia
- Coordinates: 4°36′46″N 74°4′22″W
- Elevation: 2,598 metres (8,524 ft)
- Construction started: 1952
- Completed: 1953
- Inaugurated: 17 May 1953
- Owner: Sercotel

Height
- Height: 70 metres (230 ft)

Design and construction
- Designations: Hotel

Other information
- Number of rooms: 573

Website
- Official website

Hotel Tequendama & Centro de Convenciones (Convention Center) is an historic hotel in Bogotá, Colombia. It is located in the San Diego neighborhood of the town of Santa Fe at the intersection of Tenth Avenue and Twenty-Sixth Avenue. The hotel, designed by Holabird & Root, John Burgee, and the Colombian architectural firm Cuéllar Serrano Gómez, was constructed between 1950 and 1951. Between 1967 and 1970, the hotel was expanded to double its original size. In 2025 the hotel was completely renovated and separated in two: Tequendama Hotel Bogotá and Four Points by Sheraton Tequendama.

== History ==
The Hotel Tequendama occupies the grounds of the former San Diego cloister, the Superior School of War, the Military School and the Ministry of Defense. The hotel was the first building constructed in the Centro Internacional Tequendama complex. Its construction took place within the framework of the expansion of Tenth Avenue. When first constructed, the hotel adjoined the Centennial Park. The hotel was the tallest building built in the city in the 1950s.

On May 17, 1953, Hotel Tequendama was inaugurated with a banquet attended by the President of Colombia, Roberto Urdaneta Arbeláez. Between 1967 and 1970 an extension was built in the same style as that of the original building. At this time, the hotel's main entrance was relocated to Tenth Avenue, the building was given a T-shaped plan, several conference rooms were added, and its capacity was doubled. For more than 50 years, Hotel Tequendama was managed by the InterContinental Hotels Group (IHG) for the InterContinental Hotels and Resorts brand. So, it was known until 2007 as Hotel InterContinental Tequendama. That year it was announced that the hotel would switch to the Crowne Plaza brand of the Inter Continental Hotels Group (IHG). So, the hotel was renamed Hotel Crowne Plaza Tequendama. The hotel Is considered a national monument in Bogotá.

== Etymology ==
Tequendama is a word derived from the Chibcha language of the Muisca, who inhabited the Bogotá savanna in the times before the Spanish conquest. It means "he who precipitates downward".

== Gallery ==
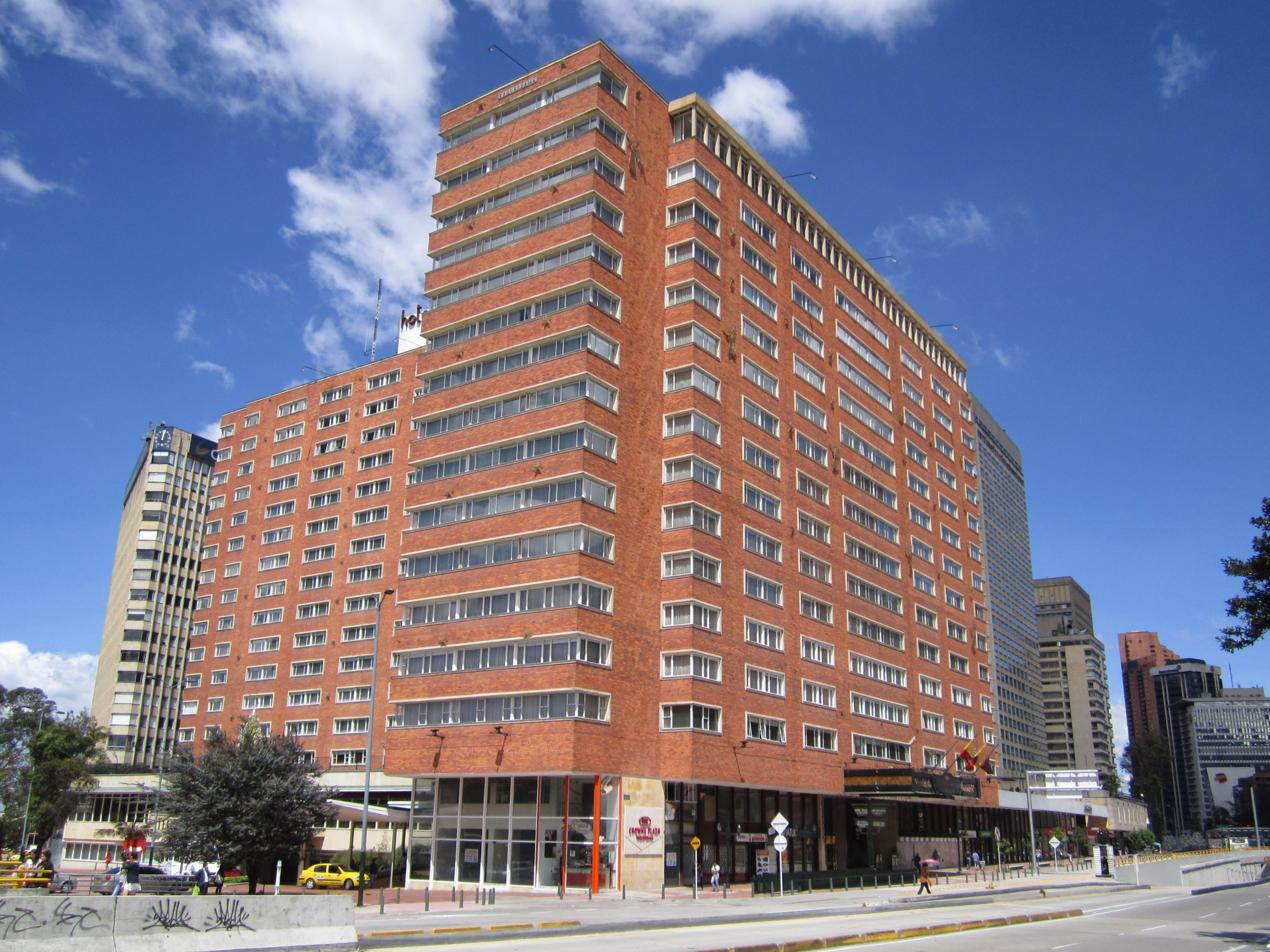
View of the hotel

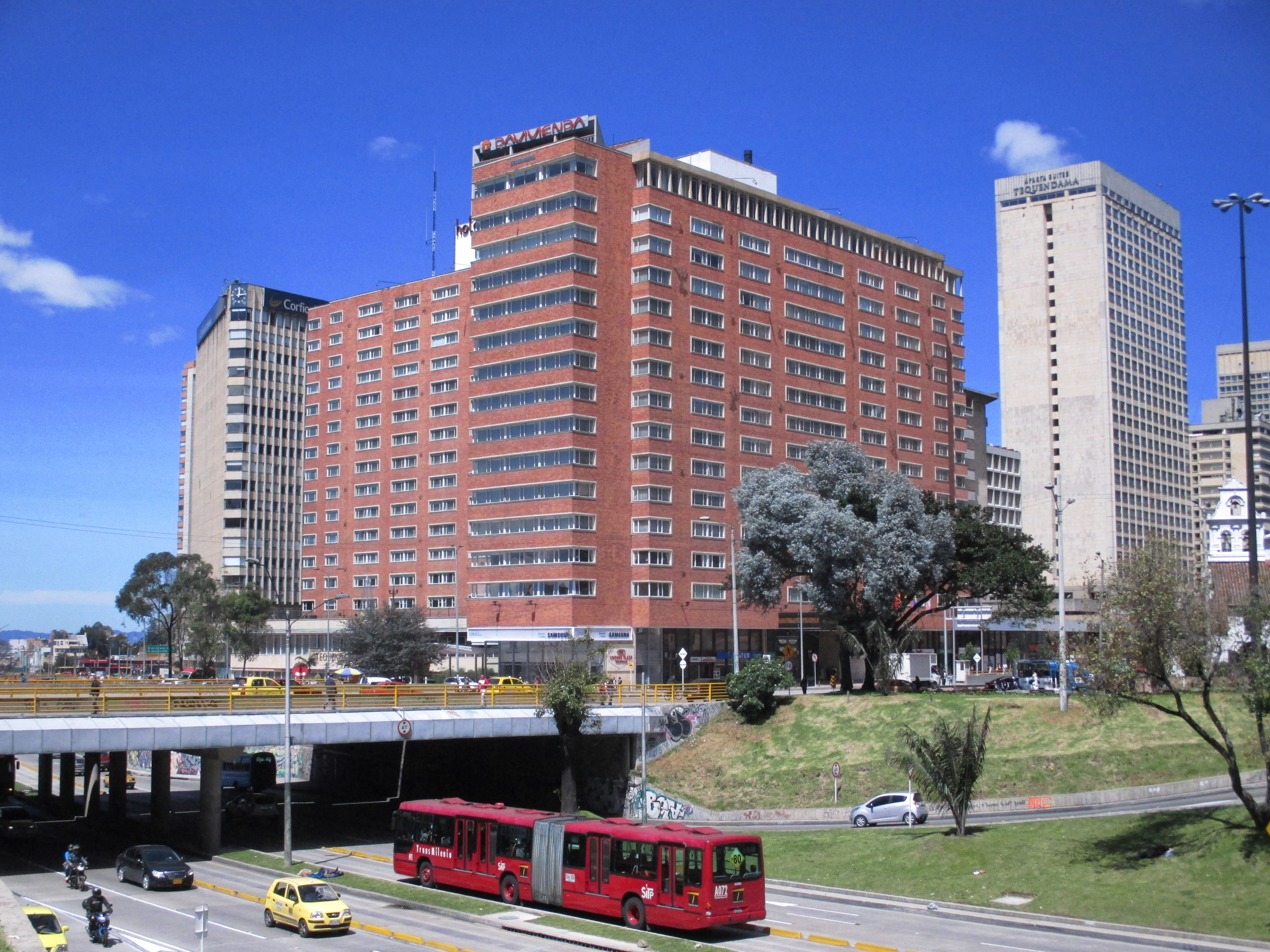
Hotel view with TransMilenio bus

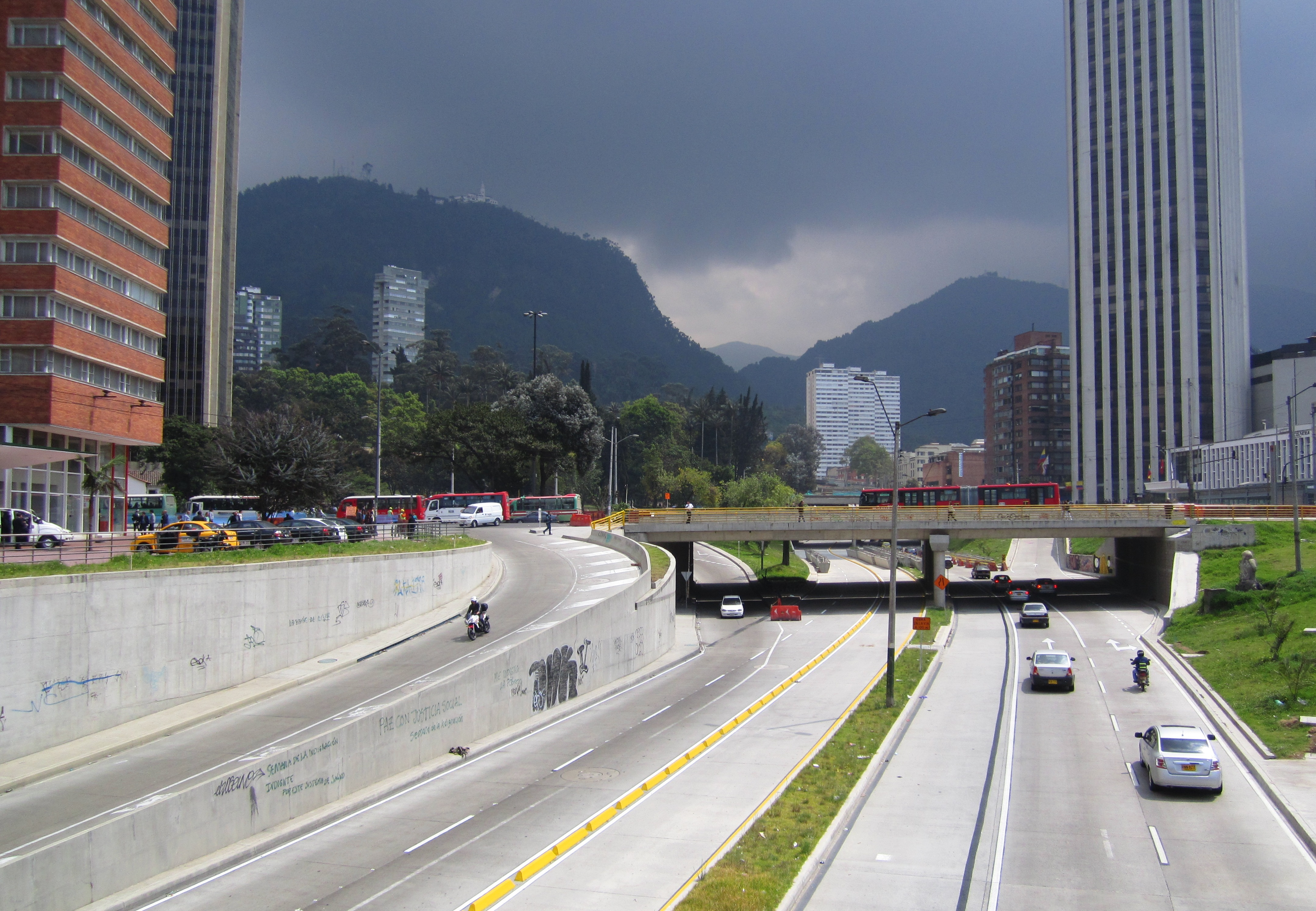
Hotel Tequendama to the left, Avenida Calle 26 and Monserrate in the background

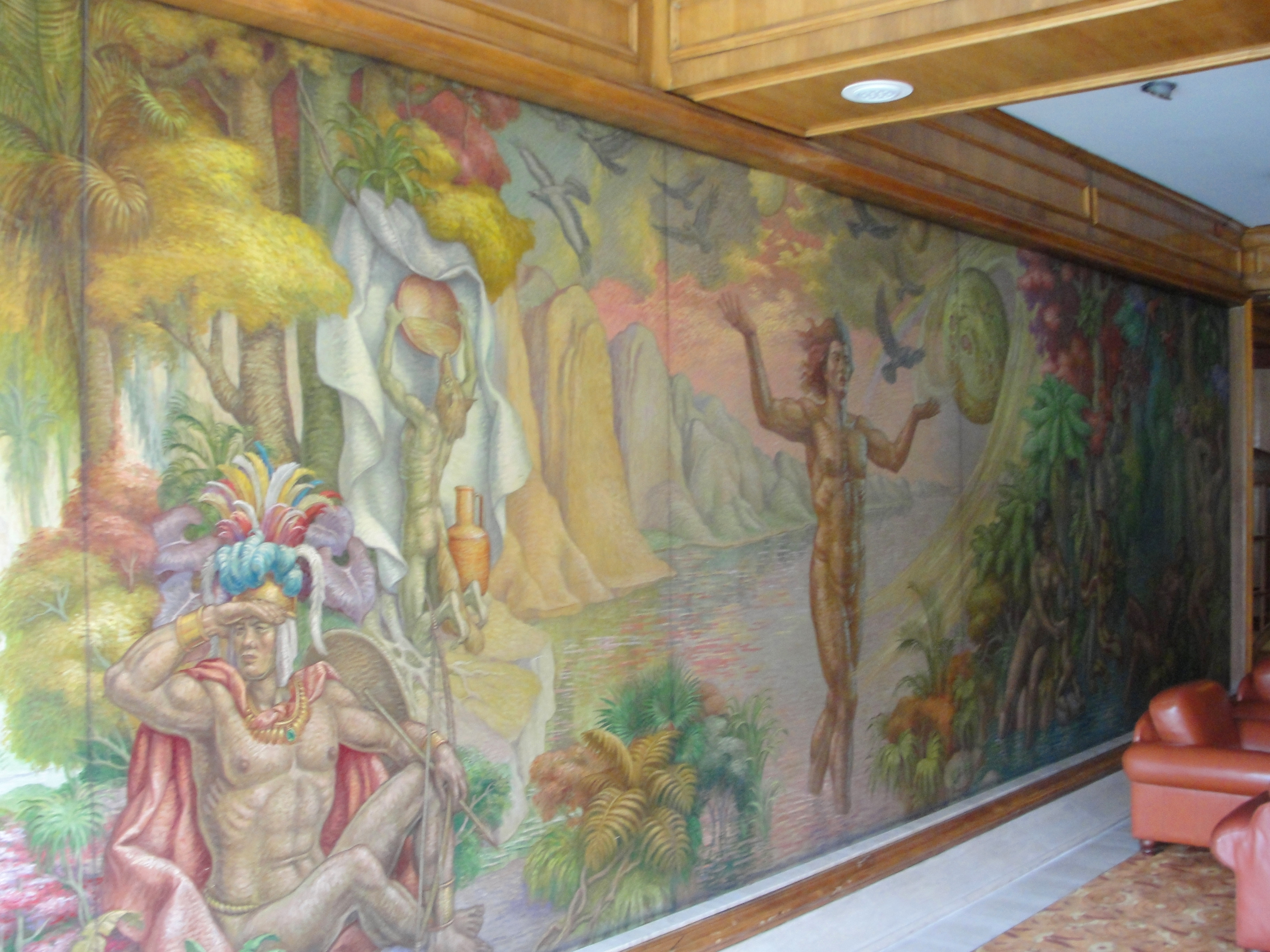
Mural of the Muisca deities in the lobby of the hotel

== See also ==
- Tequendama
- Tequendama Falls

== Bibliography ==
- Fontana, María Pía; Mayorga Cárdenas, Miguel Y. (2013), De centro moderno a centralidad urbana: el conjunto Tequendama-Bavaria, 1950-1982 en Bogotá - From modern centre to urban centre: the Tequendama-Bavaria metropolitan area in Bogotá, 1950-1982 (PDF), Universidad de los Andes, pp. 56–75
- Fontana, María Pía; Mayorga Cárdenas, Miguel Y. (2008), Sector 2 - Centro Internacional (PDF), pp. 98–106
- Murcia Piraquive, Angélica (2010), Hotel Tequendama (1953-2009): un microcosmos de la Bogotá Cosmopolita (M.A.) (PDF), Universidad La Javeriana, pp. 7–139
