= La Perseverancia, Bogotá =

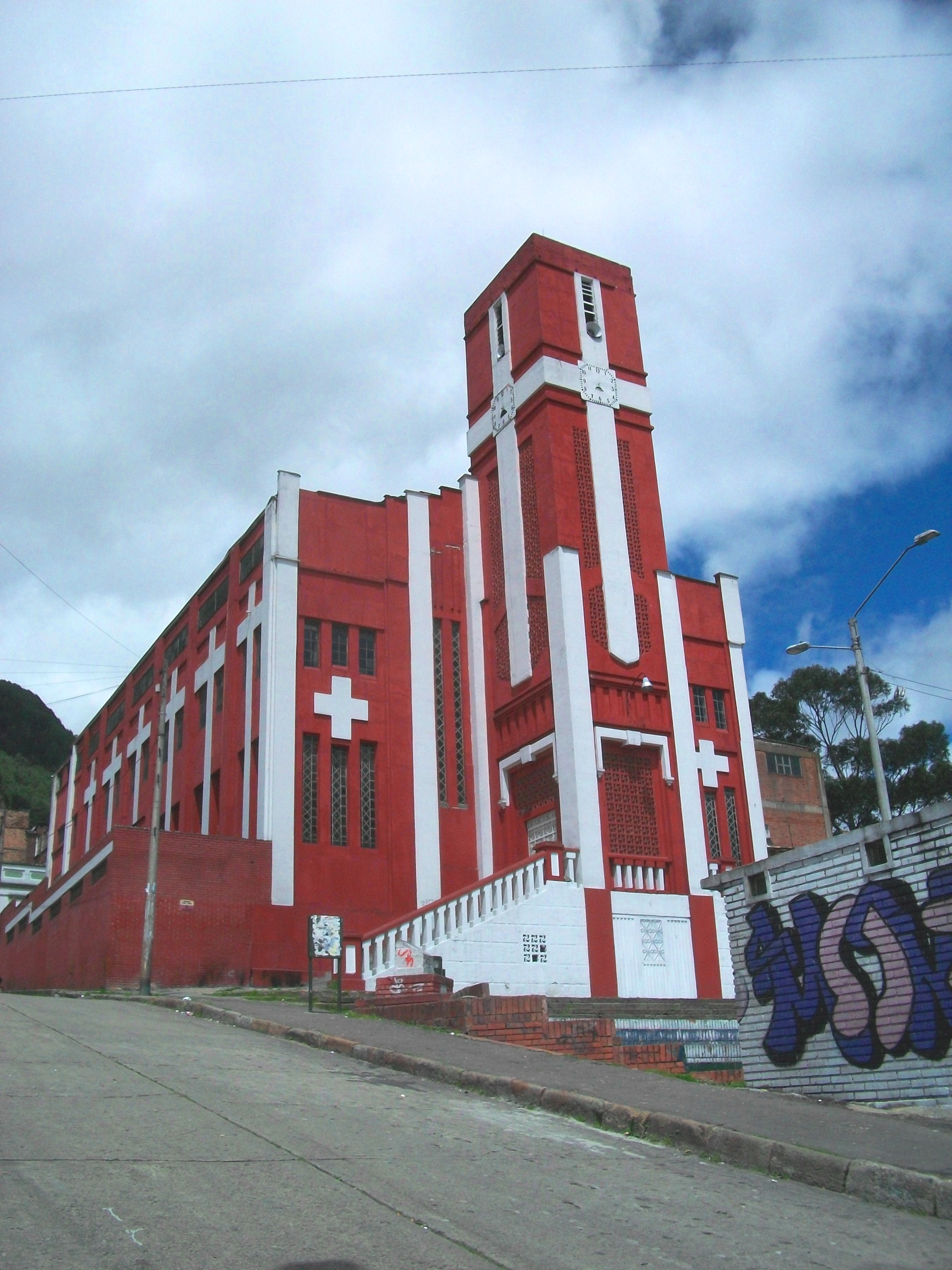
Iglesia Jesucristo Obrero

La Perseverancia is a neighborhood of the UPZ of La Macarena, situated in the Santa Fe locality of the capital of Colombia, Bogotá. It is located in the eastern edge of the city. It was founded in the beginning of the 20th century as a working neighborhood situated on the outskirts of the urban perimeter. Its growth accompanied the development of the Bavaria brewery, in the nearby San Diego neighborhood.

== History ==
Its development is related to establishment the Bavaria brewery. Many residents of the Egipto and Belén neighborhoods moved to the areas above San Diego with the support of Leo Kopp, who founded the brewing company in 1889.

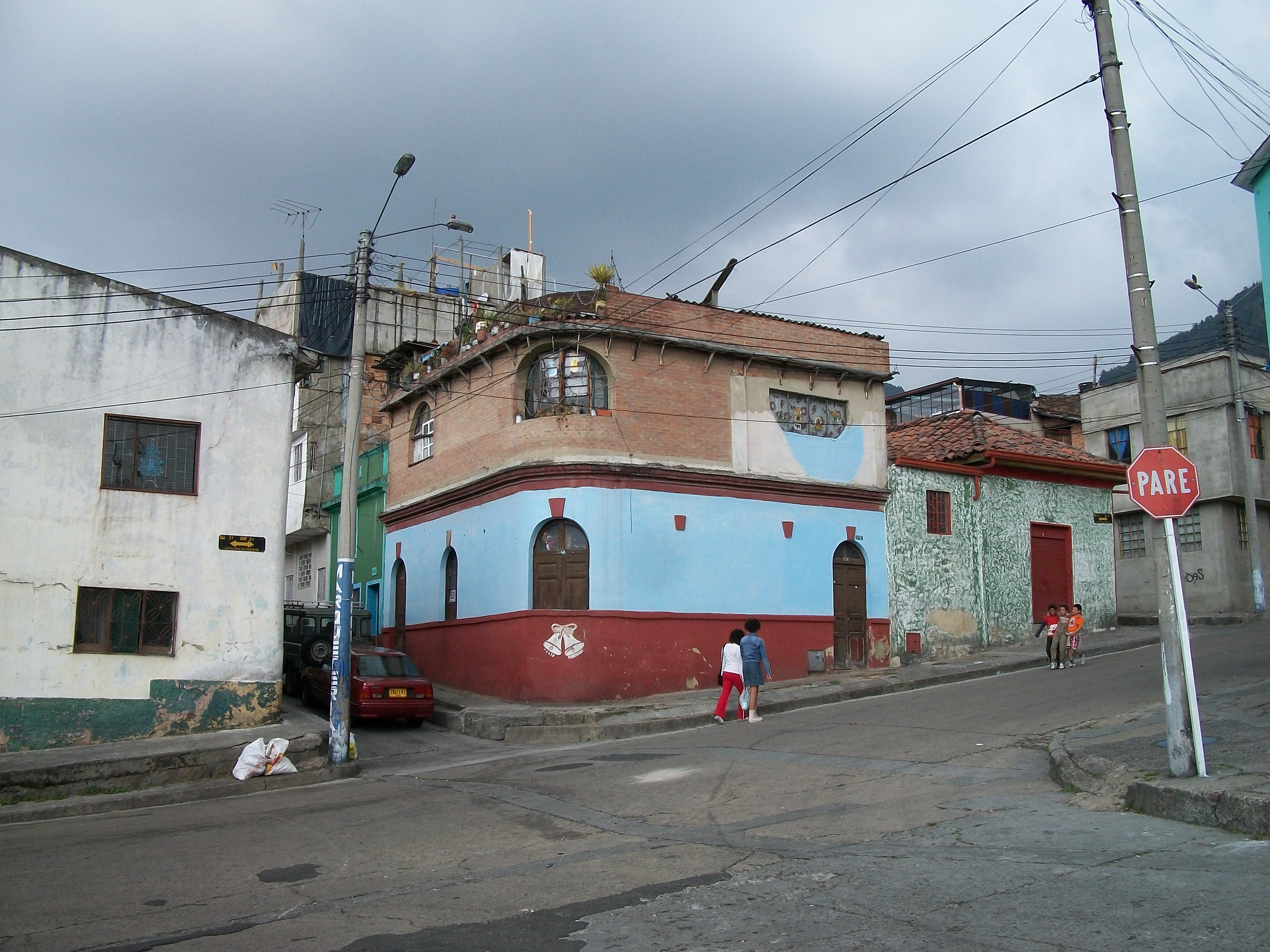
The northern limit of the neighborhood is at Carrera Cuarta.

The first buildings were made mostly of adobe and raised in the early 1910s on 4.30×8-meter plots. It was inaugurated on 1 May 1914 and was called the Plaza de Trabajo. In its center is situated the Monumento al Trabajo.

The consolidation of the neighborhood was slowed because some of the homes were built by the residents at different and on different schedules while some lots were allocated to the raising of corn, potatoes and vegetables during times when there were resources for the construction. Afterwards there was difficulty with installation of public services which were already common in the rest of the city.

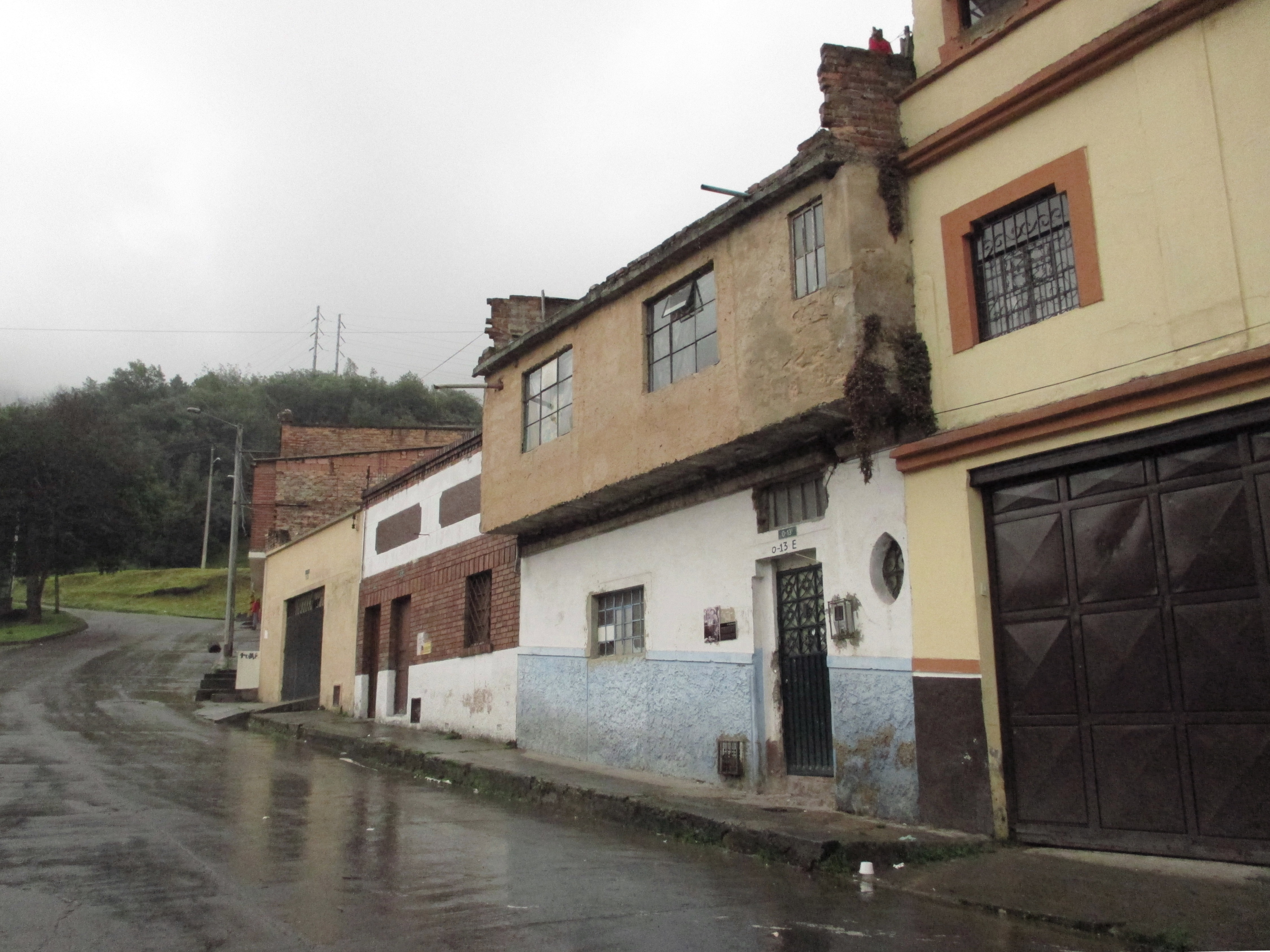
Northeastern boundary of the neighbourhood, near the Parque nacional Enrique Olaya Herrera

During this period, la Perseverancia received water from the Chorro de Padilla or Rio Arzobispo. This situation resulted in the construction of water reservoirs in Carrera Séptima at Calle Treinta Y Uno, and another where a church is currently found. Because of the lack of electricity, illumination included wax candles and coal or wood-burning stoves. The boys of the neighborhood often had to collect firewood from the Eastern mountain range.

During the second half of the 1940s the neighborhood was an area of support for the politician, Jorge Eliécer Gaitán, where a march by torchlight known as the Marcha de las Antorchas was held on his behalf.

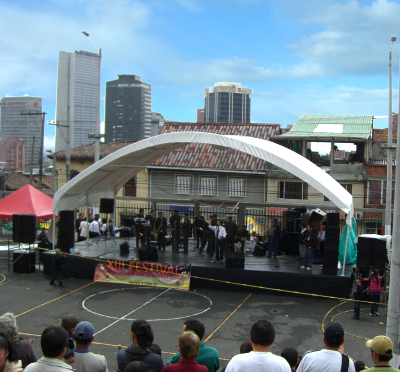
Stage at the Festival de la chicha, la vida, y la dicha

== Boundaries ==
On the north, it is bounded by the Colegio San Bartolomé La Merced school along Calle Treinta y tres. Its southern edge separates it of the La Macarena neighborhood along Calle Treinta y Uno. Along the western side, it is separated from the San Martín and La Merced neighborhoods by Carrera Quinta (Fifth Avenue), and its eastern boundary marks the urban perimeter along Carrera Primera, which is located a few blocks further up from the Avenida Circunvalar.

== Works ==
Some of the notable buildings in the neighborhood are the Plaza Distrital de Mercado on Carrera Quinta at Calle Treinta, and the Templo de Jesucristo Obrero.

== Events ==
Many of the neighborhood homes used to sell homemade alcoholic beverages which are now symbolic of the annual Festival de la Chicha, la Vida y la Dicha held every October. La Perseverancia is also known for its tradition of manufacturing artisanal fireworks.

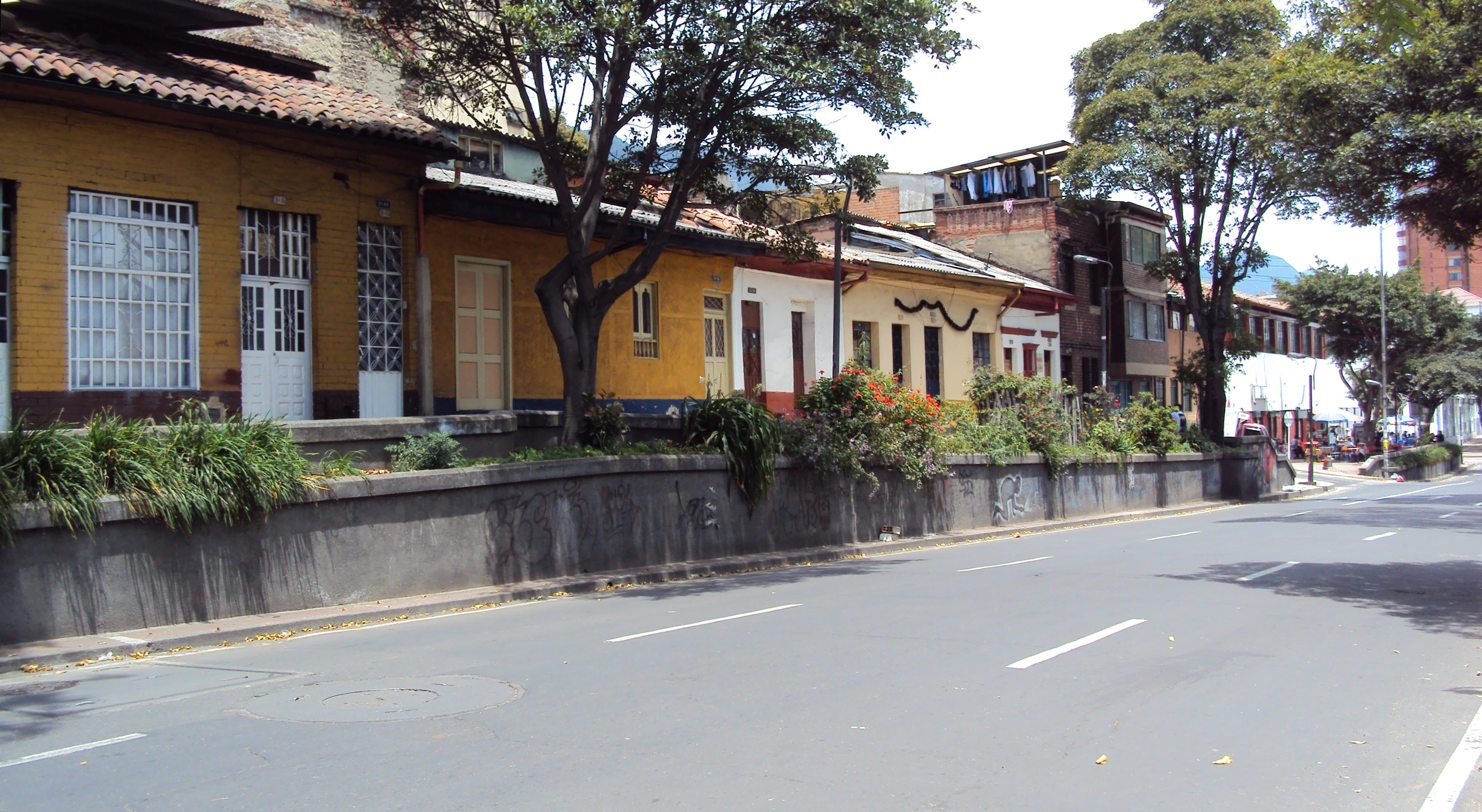
Carrera Quinta near the Plaza Distrital de Mercado

== Transportation ==
Along the eastern and western limits, the neighborhood counts on two avenues which connect it to the rest of the city. The Carrera Quinta goes to the downtown and eastern parts of the city through its connection to Avenida El Dorado while the Avenida Circunvalar provides access to the north.

== See also ==
- History of Bogota

== Bibliography ==
- VV. AA., director Fabio Puyo Vasco, Historia de Bogotá Tomo III - Siglo XX, Bogotá, 2007 ISBN 9789588293318.
- Liliana Ruiz Gutiérrez, Esteban Cruz Boy, La Perseverancia Barrio obrero de Bogotá, Bogota.gov.co, 2007.
