= National Park (Bogotá) =

National monument of Colombia

Enrique Olaya Herrera National Park
- Enrique Olaya Herrera Park
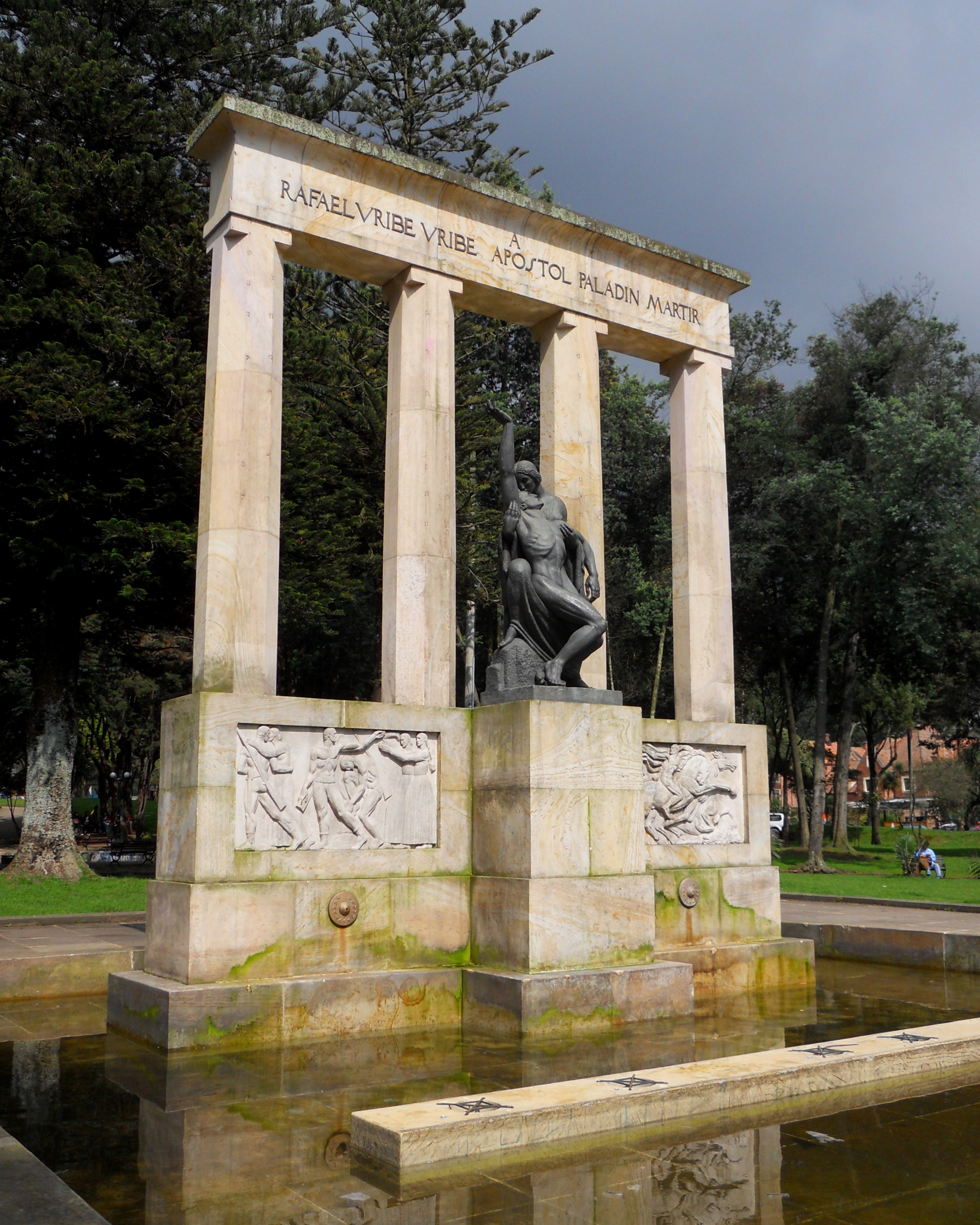
- Monument to Rafael Uribe Uribe
- Location: Bogotá, Colombia
- Area: 283 hectares (699 acres)
- Created: 1934
- Operator: Mayor's Office of Bogotá
- Status: Open all year

The Enrique Olaya Herrera National Park is located in the Eastern Hills of Bogotá, in the northeast of the town of Santa Fe. It is located on Carrera Séptima on the southern side of the Javeriana University and the Faculty of Engineering of the Francisco José de Caldas District University. It was declared a national monument of Colombia by decree 1756 of September 26, 1996.

== History ==
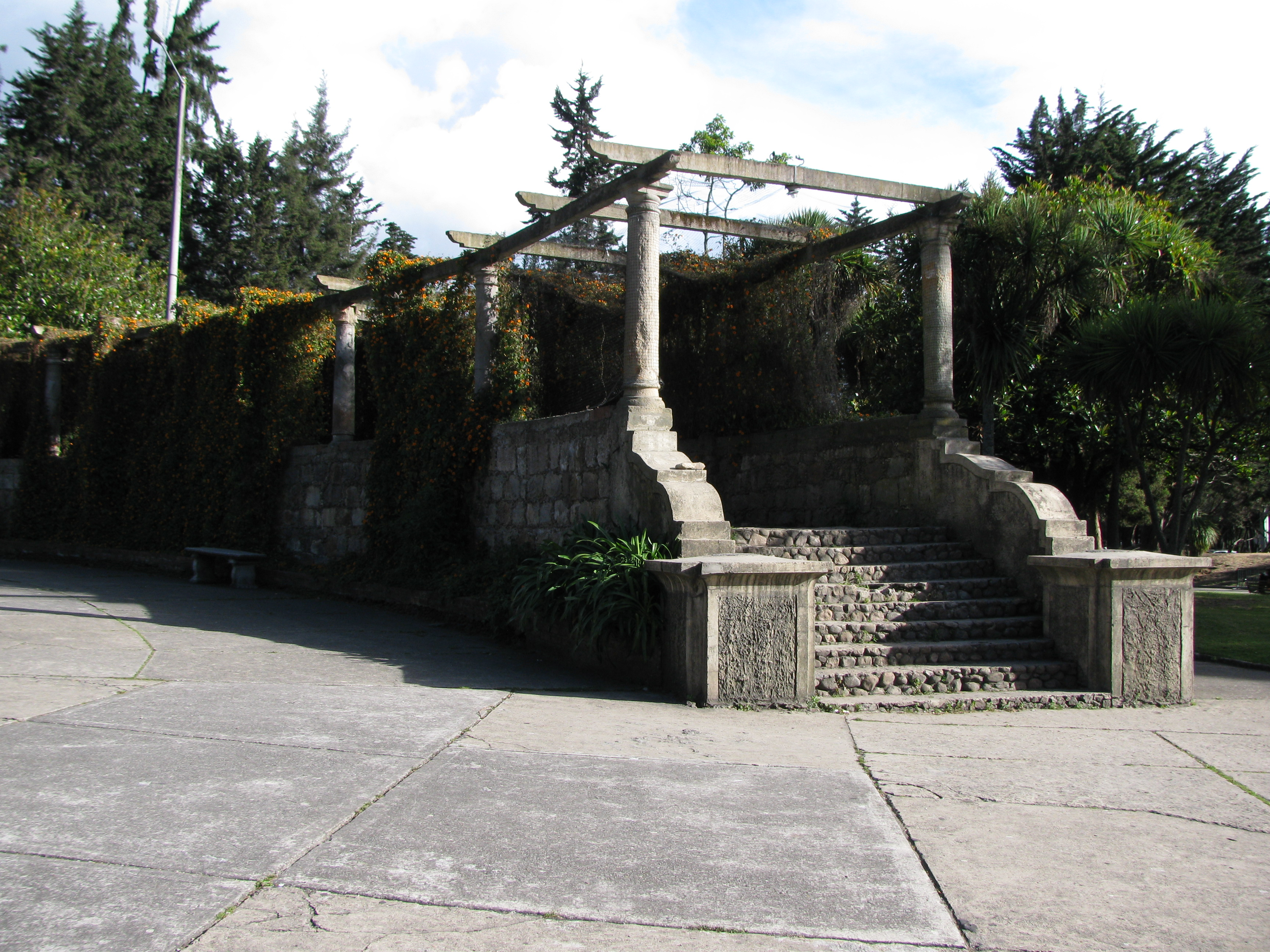
Detail of the avenue.

It was the third park built in the city, after the Centenario Park (1883) and the Parque de la Independencia (1910). The construction of the park brought together a series of circumstances that caused tensions in the city in the 1930s: the decision of the State to directly influence urban planning through large works such as parks and avenues; the aspiration of the poor inhabitants of the eastern hills to be recognized as legitimate owners of their properties or to be welcomed in new modern neighborhoods; the interest of large landowners and construction companies to prevent any public initiative that could affect future high-cost real estate developments in this part of the city. Finally, with the construction of the park, the State was able to sponsor a new model of urban development towards the west and northwest of the city; the poor neighborhoods were contained, razed or displaced towards the south of the city; the large landowners received significant profits for their properties, while the construction companies were able to develop a series of high-cost neighborhoods for the rising middle and small bourgeoisie. The park was inaugurated on August 6, 1934. President Enrique Olaya Herrera attended its inauguration and was one of its Bogotá was one of the most important promoters, hence its full name includes the mention of the president. Its heritage and tradition is very rich and is part of the city's image today. It can be considered today the most traditional park in Bogotá

The park had a mechanical amusement park and a small zoo in the eastern sector of Carrera Quinta, which were in service during the 1960s and 1970s, but later the district decided to move them.

In 1995, a restoration of the park was undertaken. During this restoration, the monuments, fountains and sports fields were recovered and two reliefs of Colombia were installed. In 2000, the avenue on Carrera Séptima was restored and the monument of Enrique Grau was inaugurated in this same sector.

On May 24, 2012, Rosa Elvira Cely was found. In honor of her tragic death, a garden was built in a section of the park that was named after her and a memorial was placed as a public act of rejection against violence and in particular violence against women and children.

From September 2021 to May 2022 and again from September 2023 to October 2024, the park has been used as a camp by the Embera indigenous community following the announcement of the end of financial aid by the District and the National Government.

== Characteristics ==
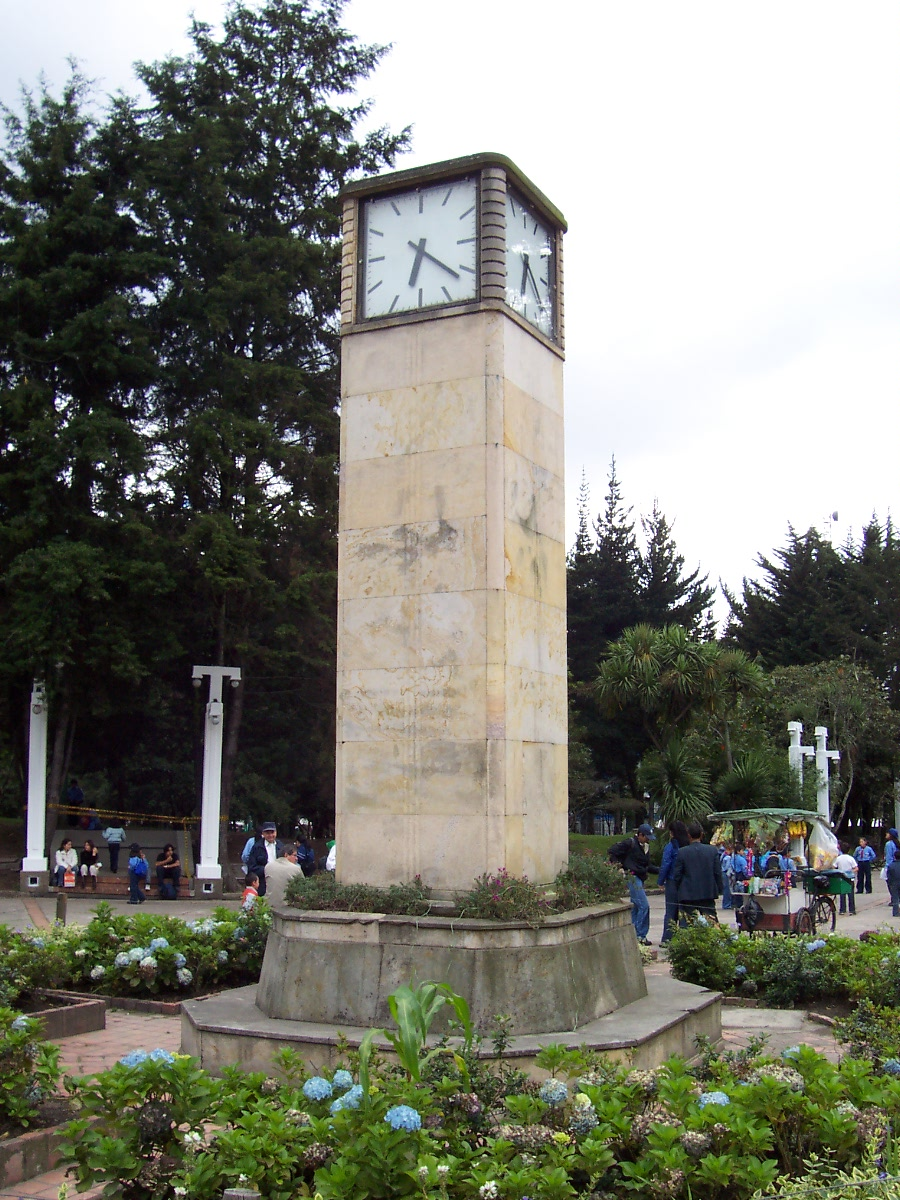
Swiss clock at the bottom of the park, near Carrera Séptima.

It is located at an altitude between 2600 and 3150 meters above sea level. Between streets 36 and 39 with Carrera Séptima and Quinta, it maintains the original layout of the park from its beginnings, which resembles an inverted triangle with paths that connect the different monuments of the park. It has an area of 283 hectares. Its eastern sector is crossed by the Arzobispo River.

On its grounds there is a small aviary, hockey rinks, skating rinks, a soccer field, volleyball rink, basketball rink, theater and a children's playground. It also has a main avenue in which the monumental fountain in honor of Rafael Uribe Uribe stands out, made in 1940 by Victorio Macho and inaugurated on October 27, 1940. The avenue continues to the east along a pedestrian path decorated with benches and lanterns, until reaching the Swiss clock tower, donated by the city's Swiss community in 1938. The park has other monuments, including the sculpture by Enrique Grau called Rita 5:30 p.m., inaugurated in 2000 on the avenue of Carrera Séptima.

The children's theater, with capacity for 300 children, was built between January and August 1936 by the architect Carlos Martínez and was declared a national monument of Colombia by decree 1802 of October 19, 1995. On its western side are the hockey, skating, tennis, volleyball, basketball and football courts, as well as a space for skating and stalls for vendors food.

The eastern section is recognized for its great biodiversity in flora and fauna, water sources and extensive tree planting (eucalyptus, acacias, urapanes and cypresses). The Arzobispo River crosses it from east to west after descending from the Eastern Hills of the city.
