= Carrera Séptima =

Transit artery in Bogotá, Colombia

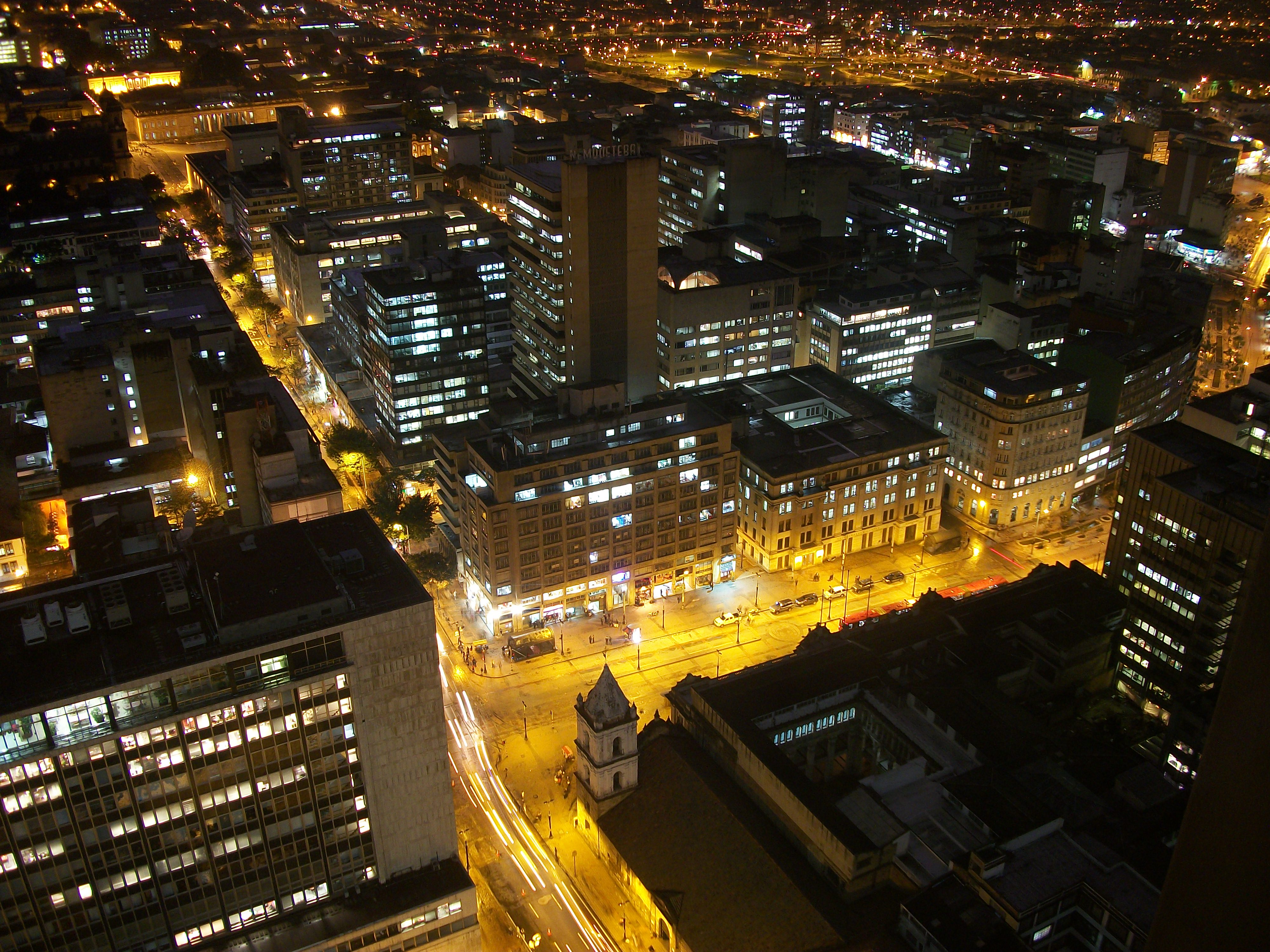
- Bolívar Square and San Francisco Church on Carrera Séptima

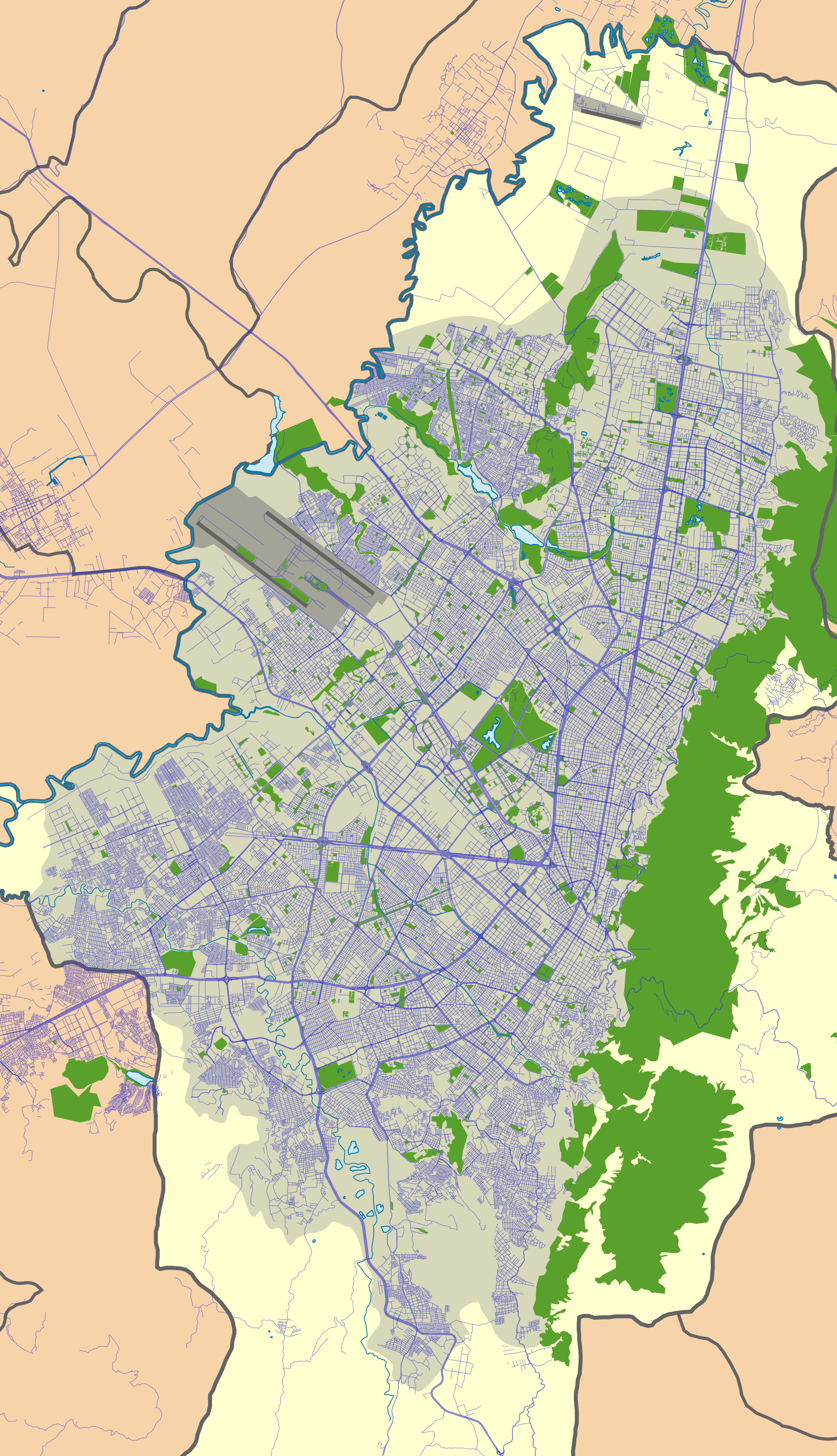
- Location within Bogotá
- Location: Bogotá; Colombia
- Coordinates: 4°41′34″N 74°01′57″W
- South end: Avenida Primero de Mayo
- North end: Autopista Norte

Carrera Séptima (Seventh Carrera), also known as Alberto Lleras Camargo Avenue, is one of the principal transit arteries which crosses the eastern side of Bogotá north and south. It is the most important thoroughfare of the city in the sense of history, culture, economy, and society. Seventh Street is bound to the east by the Eastern Hills. The road was part of the Camino Real de Santafé-Honda, a colonial royal way from Bogotá to Honda.

== Points of interest ==
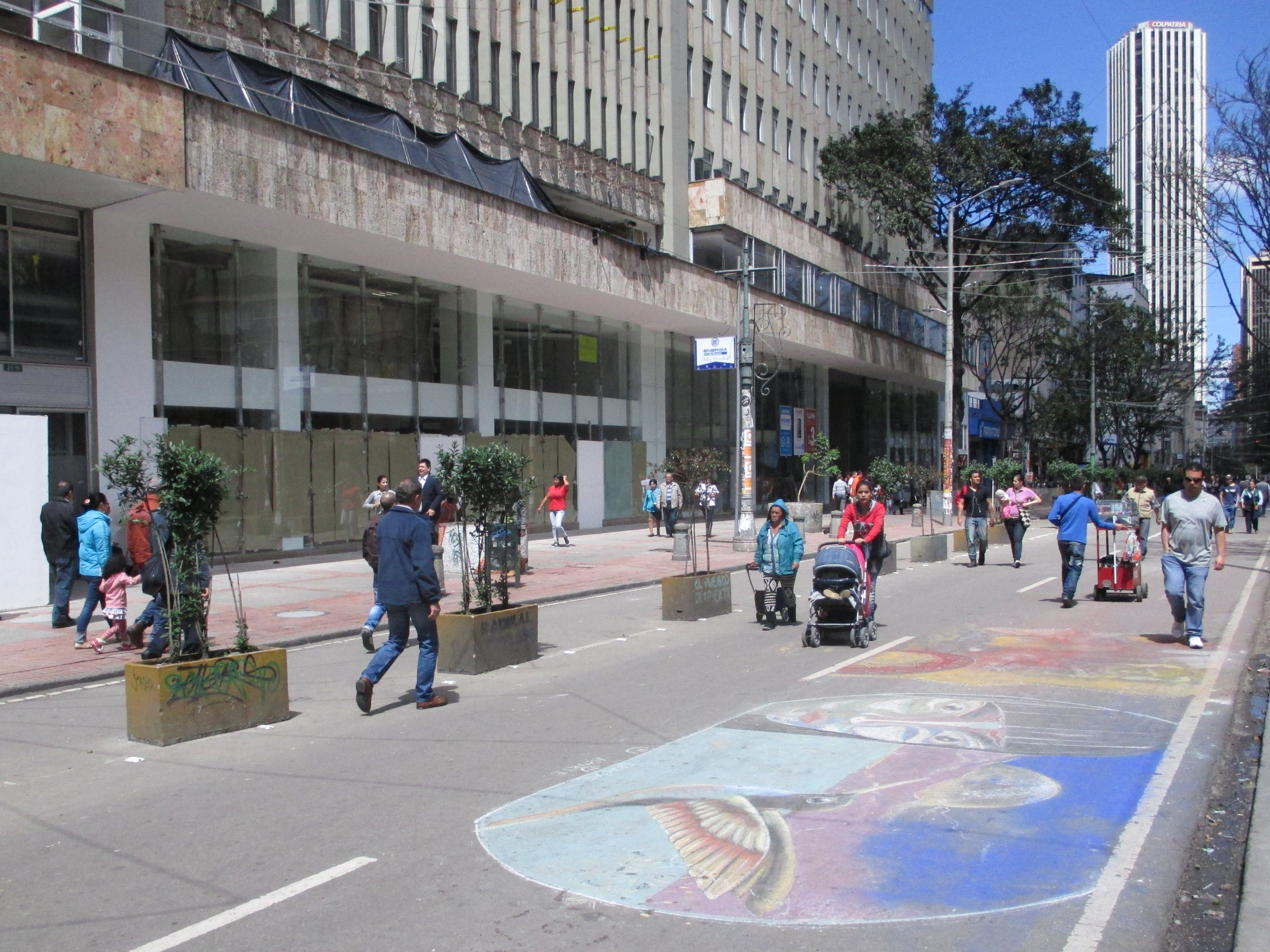
A portion of Carrera Séptima is being turned into a pedestrian walkway

Seventh Street passes through the localities of Usaquén, Chapinero, Santa Fe, and La Candelaria.

=== Usaquén ===
- The Usaquén historic zone
- El Centro Comercial Hacienda Santa Bárbara
- El Centro Empresarial Santa Bárbara
- El Cantón Norte del Ejército
- El Complejo América Centro Mundial de Negocios

=== Chapinero ===
- Parque Museo del Chicó
- Avenida Chile (Calle 72) Financial District
- Universidad Distrital Francisco José de Caldas
- Pontifical Xavierian University

=== Santa Fe ===
- Parque Nacional Enrique Olaya Herrera (Parque Nacional)
- The National Museum of Colombia
- Centro Internacional de Bogotá
- Centro Comercial Terraza Pasteur
- Torre Colpatria
- Banco de la República
- Iglesia de Las Nieves
- Iglesia de San Francisco
- Parque Santander

=== La Candelaria ===
- Bolívar Square
- Primatial Cathedral of Bogotá
- Capitolio Nacional
- Casa de Nariño

== Gallery ==
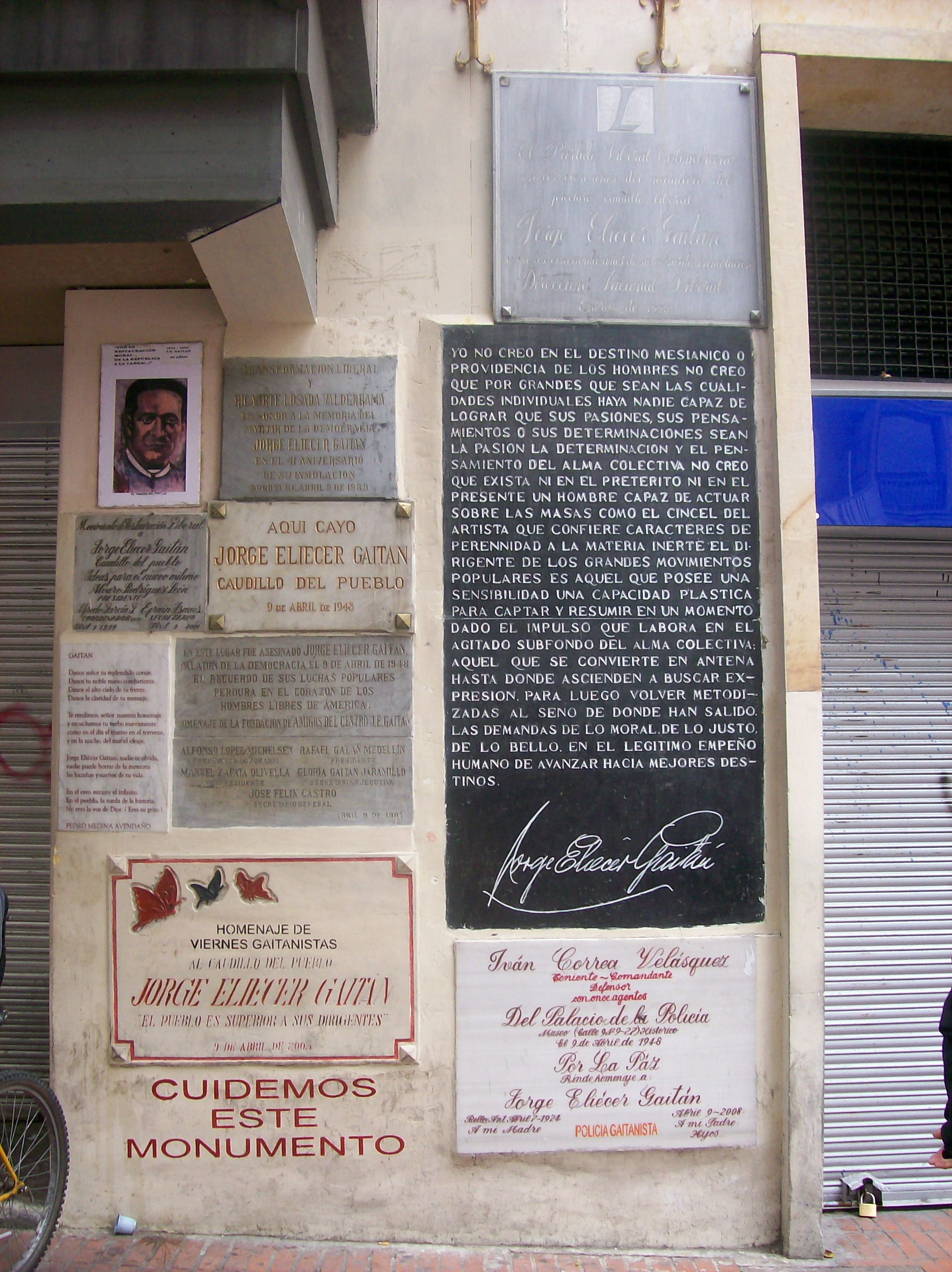
Memorial to Jorge Eliécer Gaitán

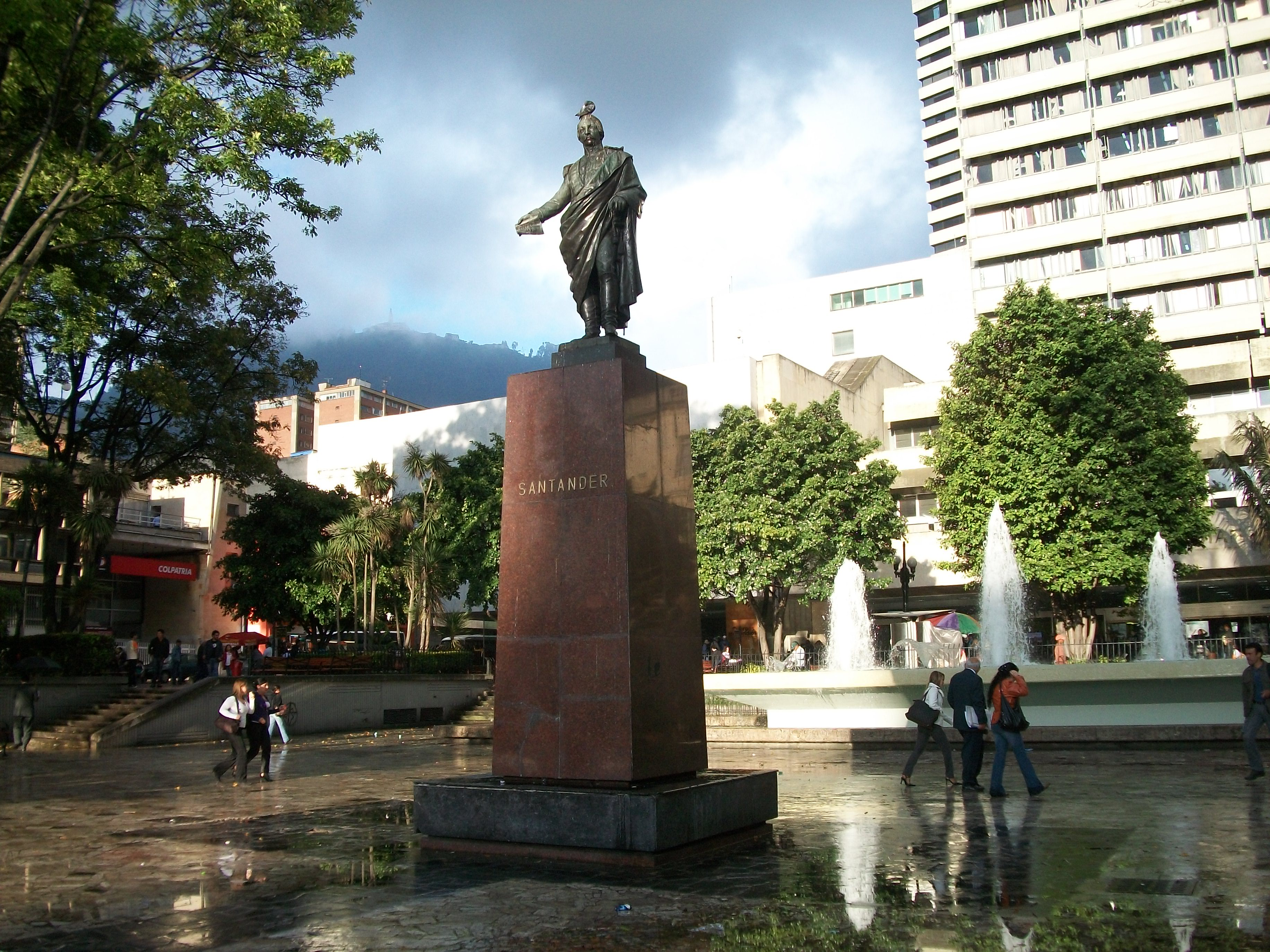
Statue of Francisco de Paula Santander in Santander Park

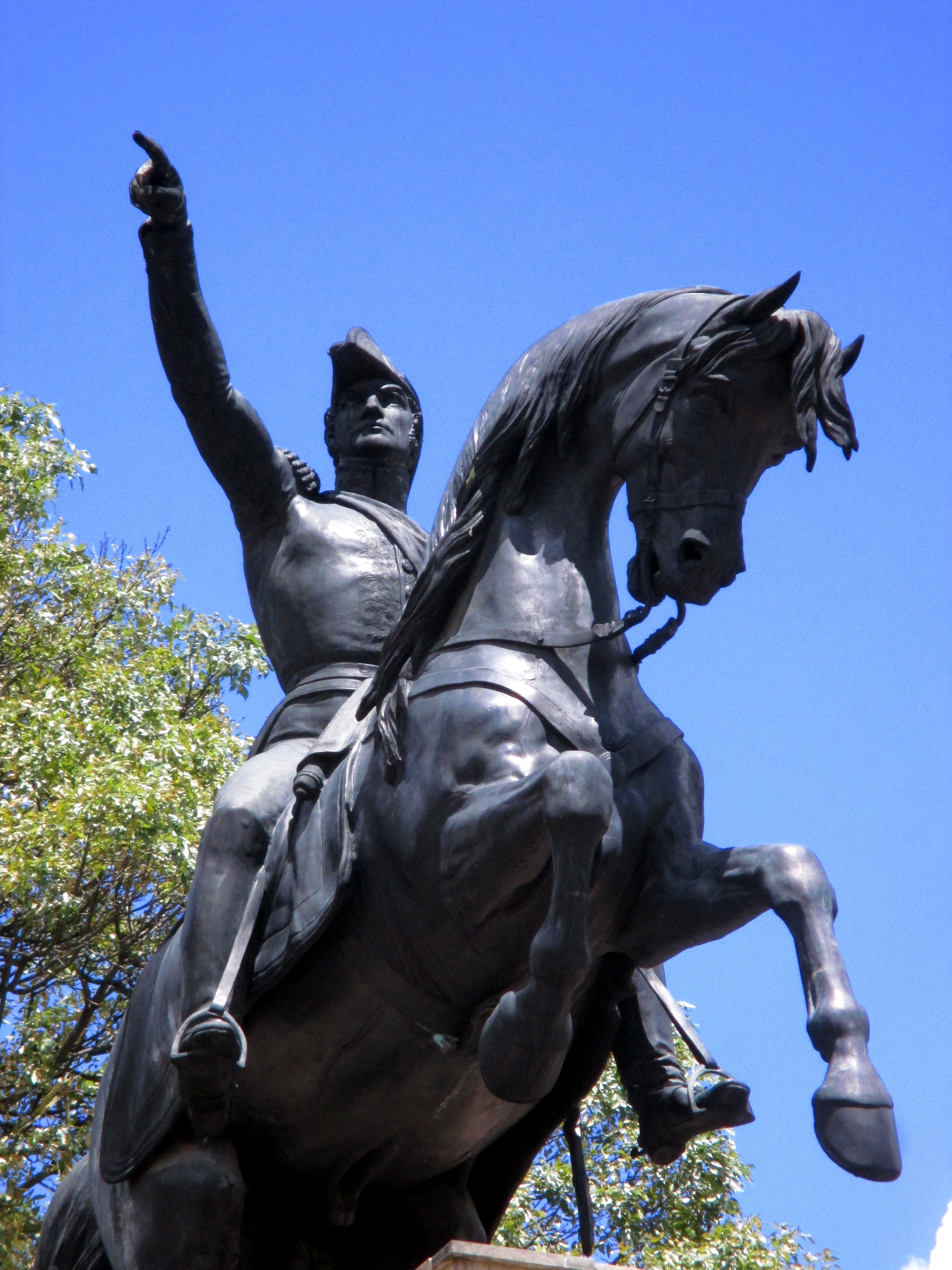
José de San Martín Monument

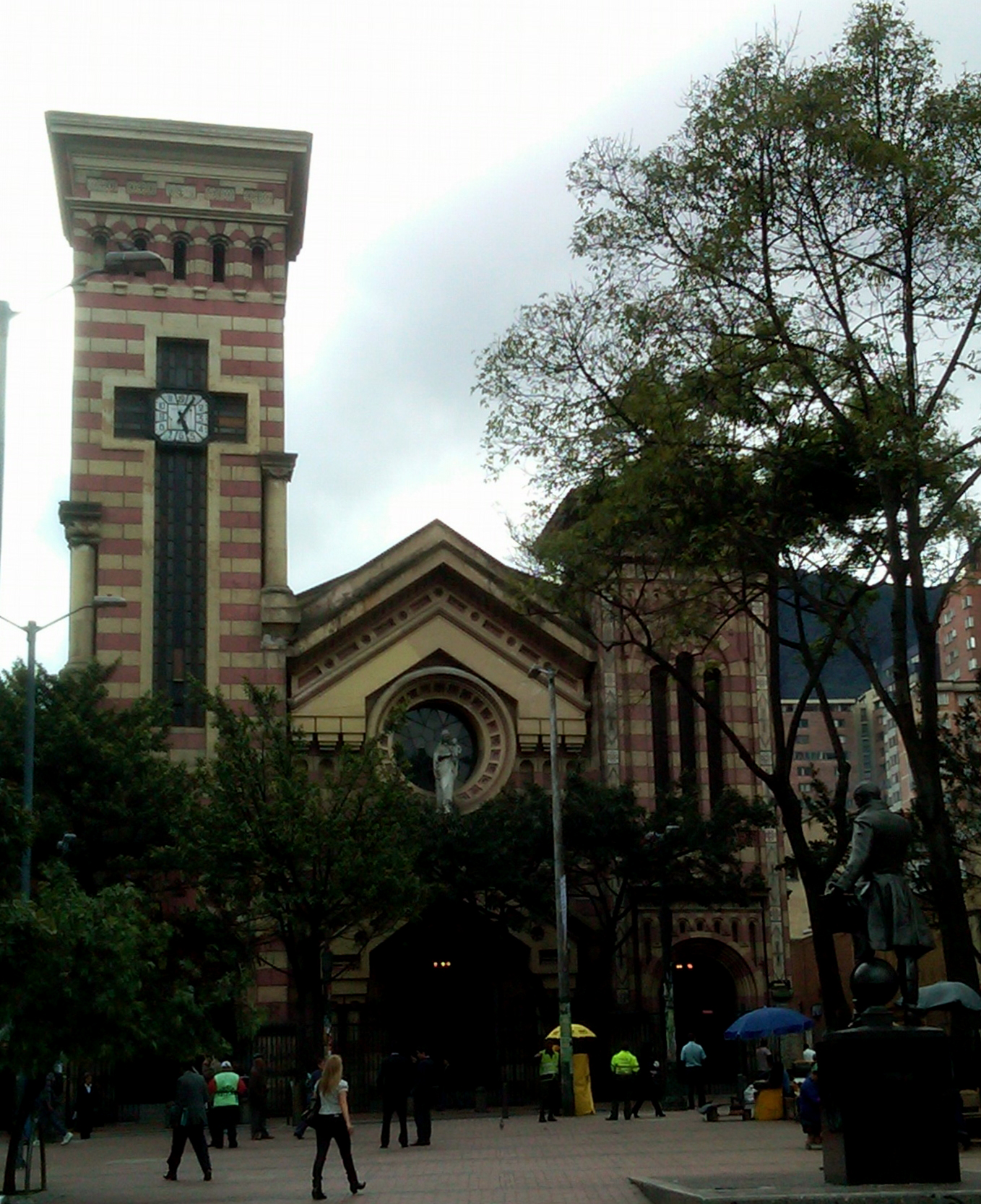
Nuestra Señora de las Nieves Church

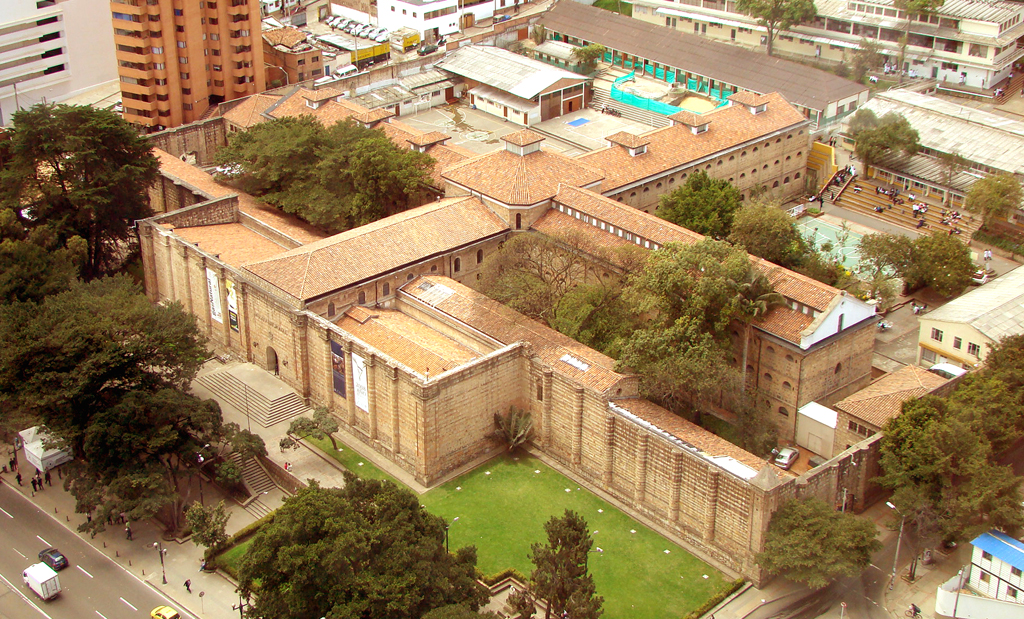
National Museum of Colombia
