= San Diego, Bogotá =

San Diego
- Barrio
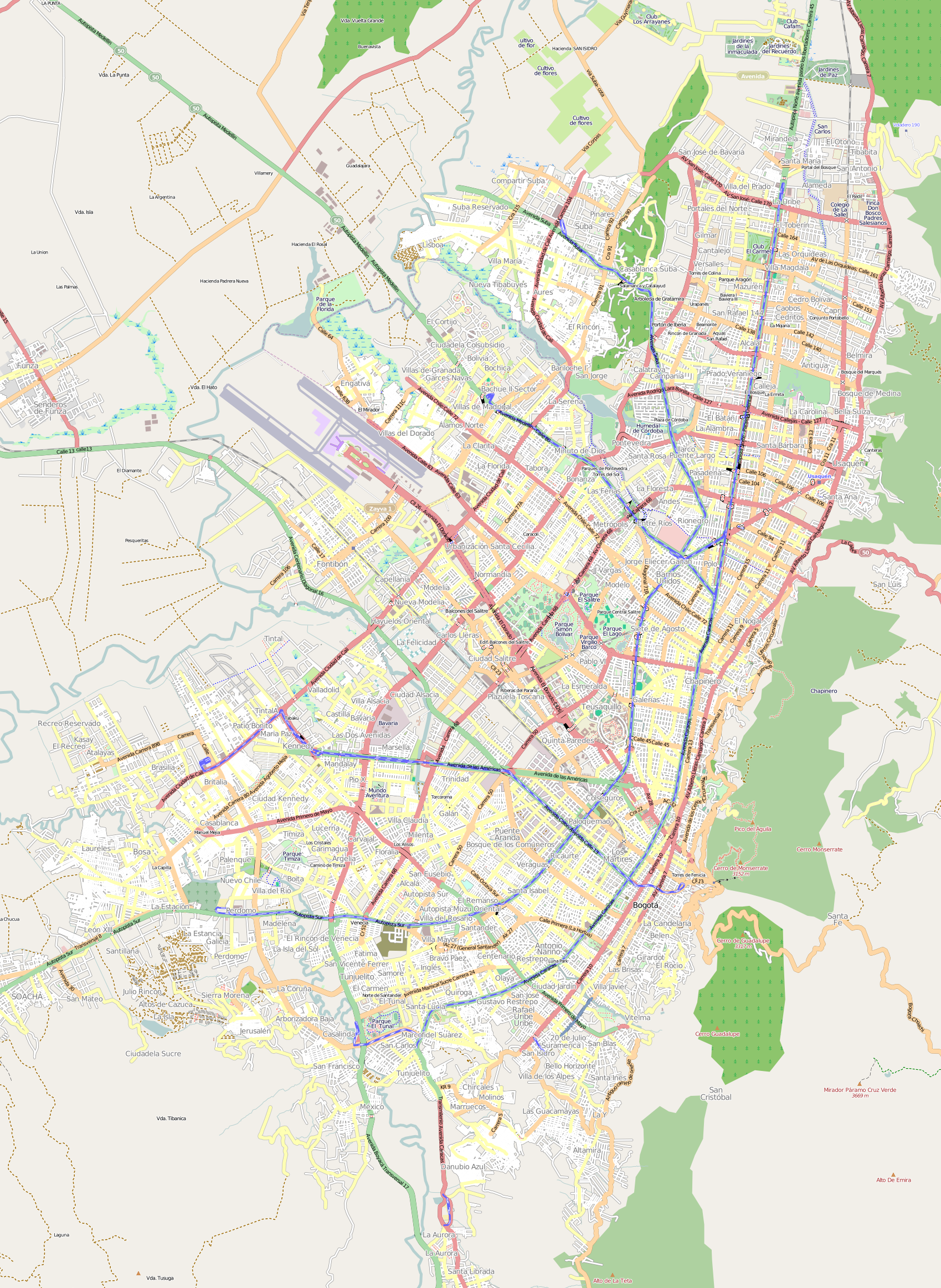
- Location within Bogotá, Colombia
- Country: Colombia
- Department: Distrito Capital
- City: Bogotá

San Diego is a neighbourhood (barrio) of Bogotá, Colombia, located in the Santa Fe locality.
