= Santa Fe, Bogotá =

Santa Fe
- Locality of Bogotá
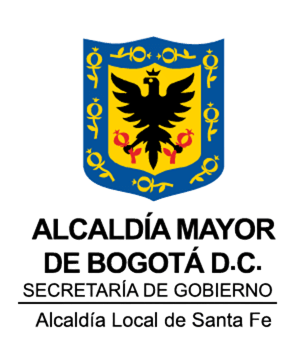
- Coat of arms

- Location of the locality in the city of Bogotá

- Location of the locality in the Capital District of Bogotá
- Coordinates: 4°36′50″N 74°04′43″W
- Country: Colombia
- City: Bogotá D.C.
- Neighbourhoods: List: Laches, Bogotá; La Perseverancia (Bogotá); San Diego (Bogotá); Santa Inés, Bogotá; San Victorino

Area
  - Total: 45.17 km^{2} (17.44 sq mi)
- Elevation: 2,600 m (8,500 ft)

Population (2023)
  - Total: 107,677
  - Density: 2,384/km^{2} (6,174/sq mi)
- Time zone: UTC-5 (Colombia Standard Time)
- Website: Official website

Santa Fe (Spanish pronunciation: [santaˈfe]) is the third locality of Bogotá, the Capital District of Colombia. Santa Fe is part of the traditional downtown area where Bogotá was founded by Gonzalo Jiménez de Quesada on August 6, 1538. Historically, this area comprised the entire main urban area of Bogotá, and was known as "Santa Fe de Bogotá".

Santa Fe hosts several key business districts in Bogotá, and is served by Carrera Séptima, one of the city's major thoroughfares. The locality is home to many of Bogotá's skyscrapers, including the International Center and the financial district along Avenida Jiménez.

The main streets of central Bogotá intersect in Santa Fe, including Carrera Séptima (formerly Calle Real), Carrera Décima, Calle 26, Avenida Circunvalar, Avenida Caracas, Avenida Ciudad de Lima, and Avenida Jiménez.

Santa Fe also includes a rural area in the Eastern Hills where Monserrate and Guadalupe are prominent landmarks. The locality of La Candelaria which was the original site of the founding of Santa Fe de Bogotá, is now an enclave within Santa Fe. La Candelaria was separated from Santa Fe following the establishment of the Capital District.

== History ==
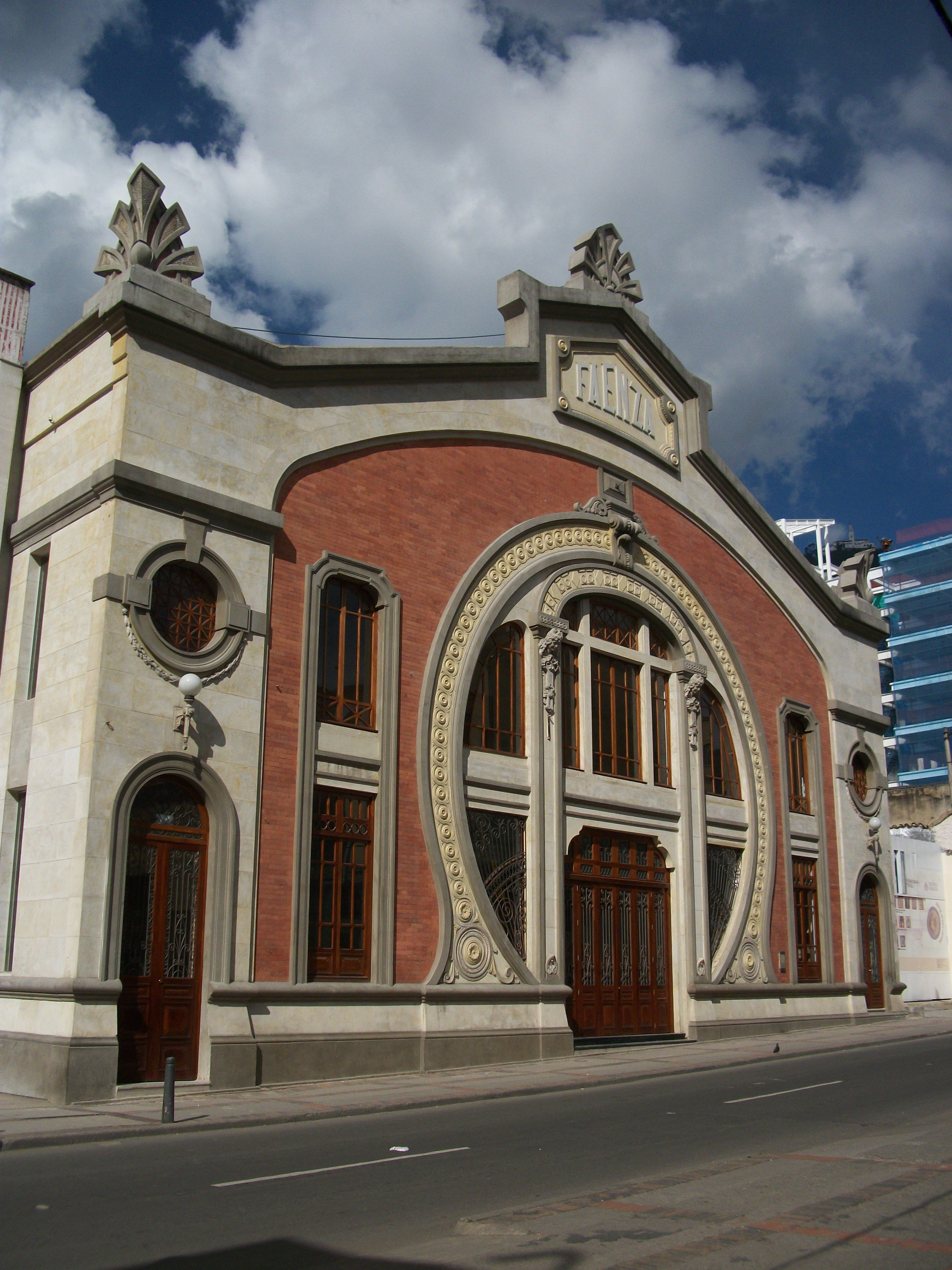
The Faenza Theater, the oldest in Bogotá

Bogotá was founded by Gonzalo Jiménez de Quesada on August 6, 1538, under the name of Santa Fe de Bogotá. The official founding took place at the Bolívar Square in La Candelaria between the rivers San Francisco (now Avenida Jiménez) and San Agustin (now Calle 6).

In the early 20th century, the city was primarily confined to the present boundaries of Santa Fe. Urbanization began to expand towards Chapinero in the 1920s, and further west in the 1950s. This westward expansion followed the destruction caused by El Bogotazo, a period of violent unrest that damaged many streets.

In 1972, Santa Fe was established as a minor city hall. With the Constitutional reform of 1991, Santa Fe was officially designated as a locality (or a Local Action Board) within the Capital District.

== General data ==
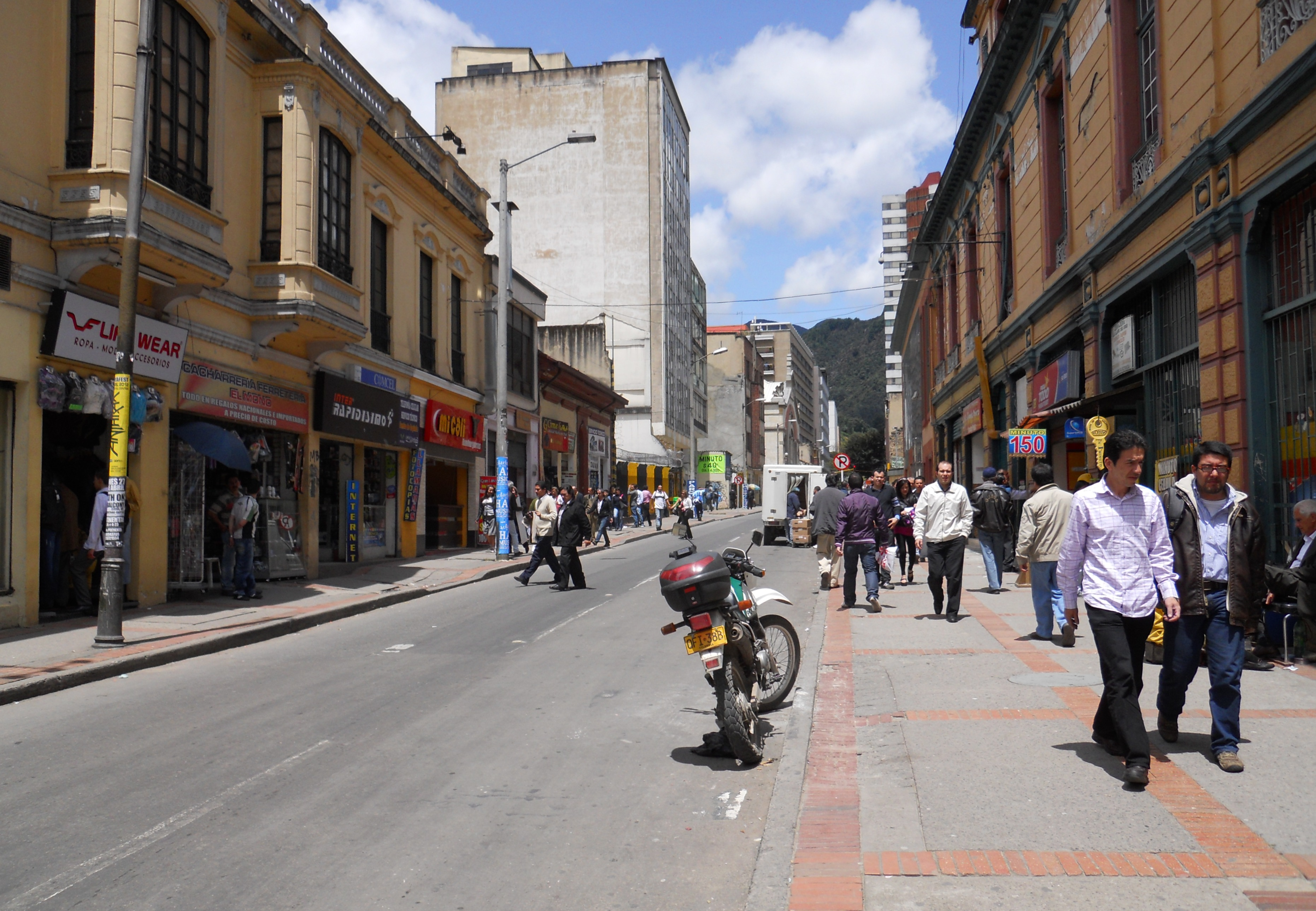
Street in Las Nieves

In 2023, Santa Fe had a population of 107,677 people according to a population projection. Its average temperature is 13 °C (55 °F). It has a total area of 4,487.74 hectares (11,089.4 acres) and an urban area of 662.06 hectares (1,636.0 acres).

To the north, Santa Fe is bordered by the Canal Arzobispo or Calle 39, bordering the locality of Chapinero. To the south, it is bordered by Avenida Primera, with San Cristóbal. In the east, it is bordered by the Eastern Hils, bordering with the municipalities of Choachí and Ubaque in Cundinamarca. Lastly, the city is bordered in the west by the Avenida Caracas, with Teusaquillo, Los Mártires and Antonio Nariño.

Among the neighbourhoods there are Las Cruces, Los Laches, La Perseverancia, La Concordia, Santa Inés, Santa Bárbara, San Bernardo, La Merced, Egipto, Germania, Las Aguas, La Paz, La Peña, Liévano, Las Nieves, El Consuelo, Belén, Egipto Alto, Central, El Rocío, Tisquesuza, La Macarena and El Bosque Izquierdo. Veredas are Monserrate and El Vergel.

Santa Fe is crossed by the San Francisco River, San Agustín River, Arzobispo River and San Cristóbal River. Because of its proximity to the Eastern Hills, the urban area near these mountains is tilted some 40 degrees.

== Economy ==
Santa Fe is primarily a commercial area, featuring a mix of small factories, service companies, and financial businesses. The locality also hosts several universities, including: University of the Andes, Universidad Externado de Colombia, Jorge Tadeo Lozano University.

In addition, Santa Fe offers various hotels and tourism facilities.

== Transport ==
TransMilenio operates along several key routes in Santa Fe:

- Avenida Caracas (Lines A and H),
- Carrera Séptima (Line M)
- Avenida Jiménez (Line J)
- A short segment of Calle 26 (Line K).

Additionally, since 1926, a funicular and an aerial tramway, have been available for ascending Monserrate.

== Sites of interest ==
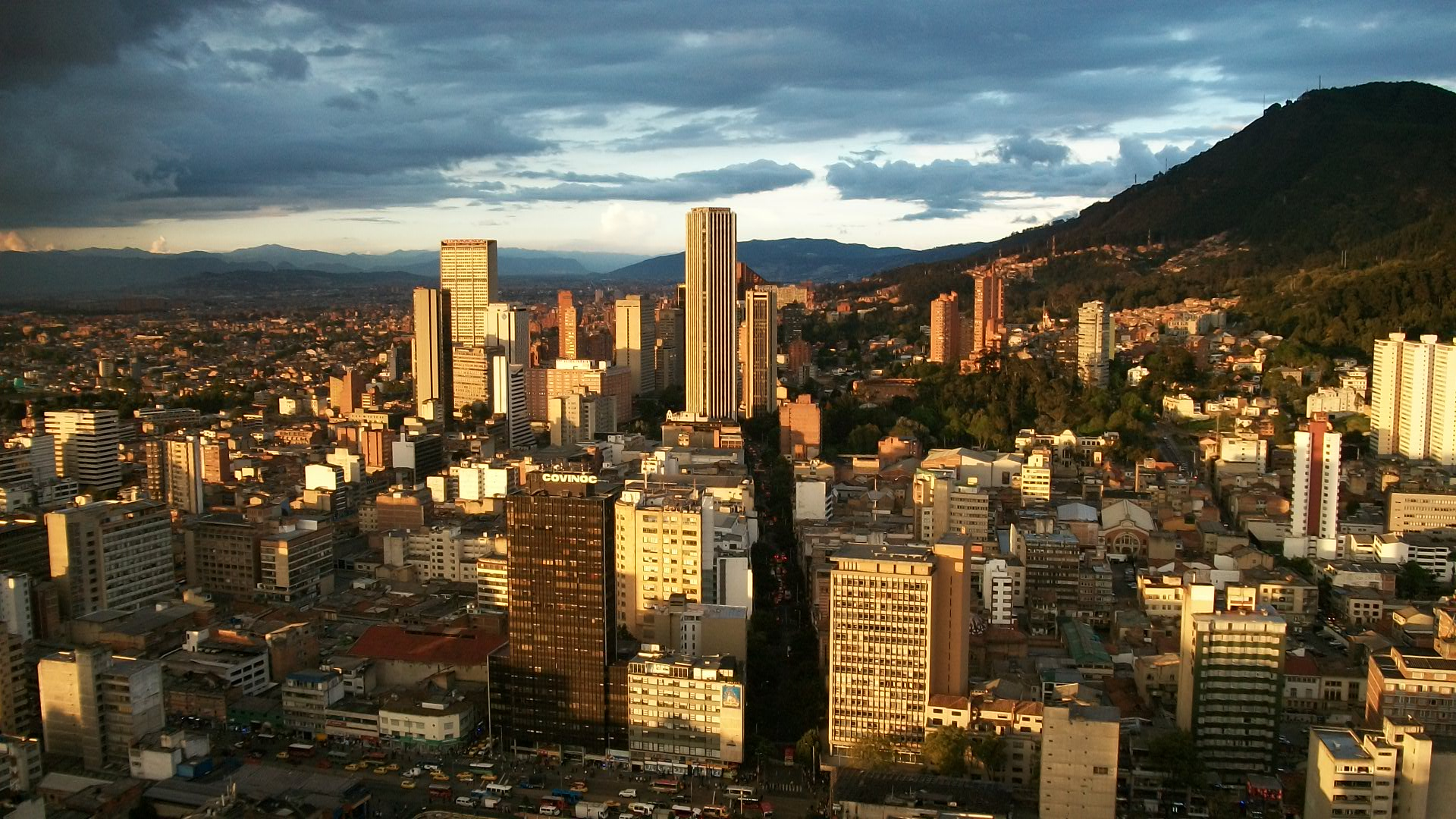
Santa Fe as seen from Avianca Tower

- BD Bacatá
- Colombian National Museum
- Colpatria Tower
- The Gold Museum
- The National Library of Colombia
- The Santamaría Bullring
- The churches of San Francisco, la Tercera, la Veracruz and la Capuchina
- Las Cruces Marketplace
- Independence Park, Tercer Milenio Park and the Olaya Herrera National Park
- The Natural History Museum
- The Planetarium
- La Rebeca
- Avianca Tower
