= Muisca music =

Music of the Muisca in Colombia

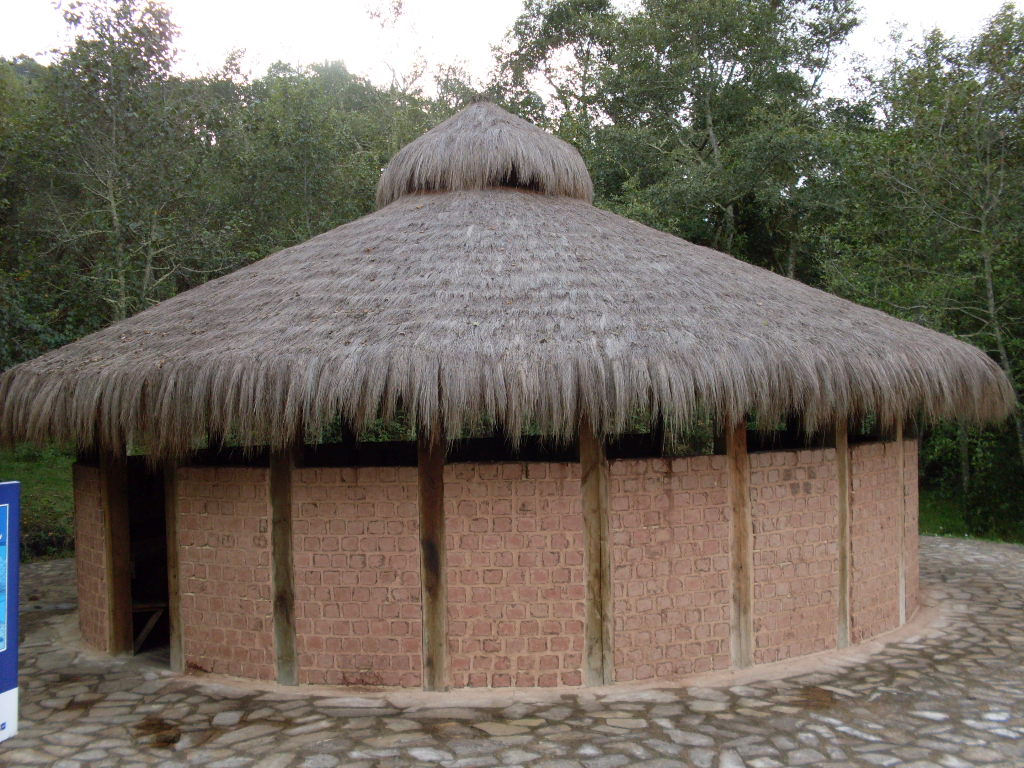
When the Muisca were constructing their houses (bohíos) they sang and danced building to the rhythm of the music

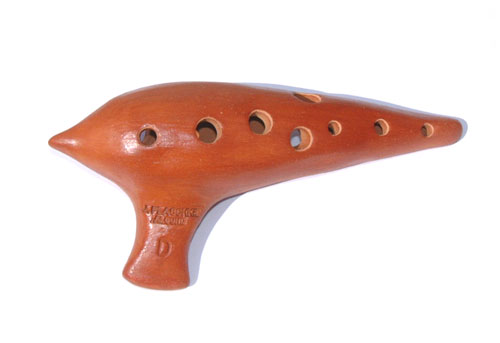
The ocarina was one of the instruments the Muisca used for their music

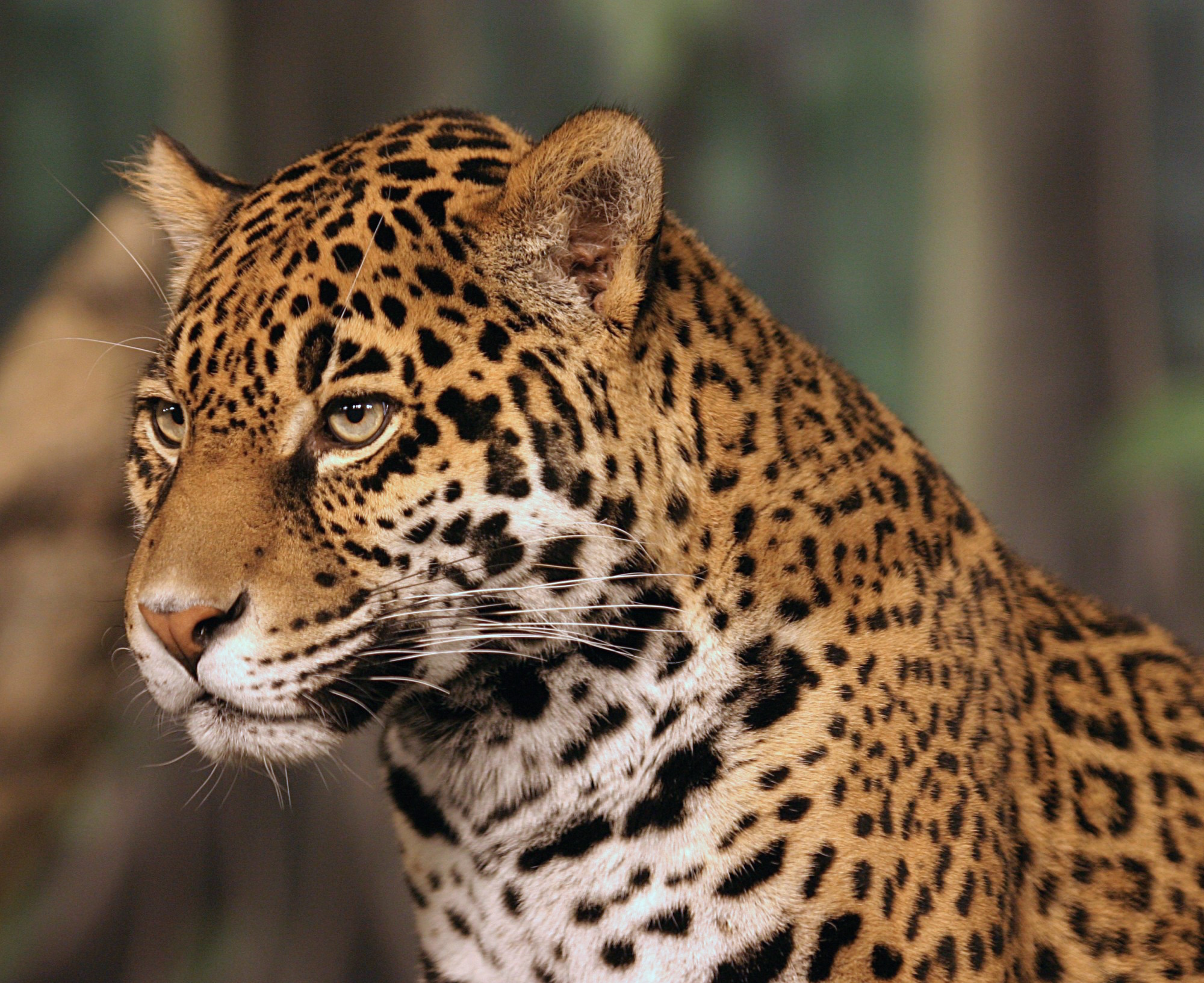
The jaguar was considered a sacred animal so the Muisca dressed up like it to please their gods

Muisca music describes the use of music by the Muisca. The Muisca were organized in the Muisca Confederation before the Spanish conquest of the Muisca of the central highlands (Altiplano Cundiboyacense) of present-day Colombia. The Muisca used music in their religious rituals, to welcome the new cacique and during harvest, sowing and the construction of the houses.

== Muisca music ==
The music of the Muisca was produced in a magic-religious sense; music was played during religious rituals where the Muisca people gathers to worship the Sun (Sué), the Moon (Chía) and other deities. The music served as hope for the guecha warriors and to relieve the pain of the dead.

According to the Spanish chroniclers, the music of the Muisca was sad and monotonous. The people could play music during events that took a full month to please their gods where they sang about the wars fought and begged the gods for victory in future wars. Everytime a war was fought, the Muisca danced and sang.

Also during sowing and harvests in their agriculture, the people sang and danced continuously. While singing they removed the loose rocks of the farming fields. The sacrifices, sometimes human in character, were accompanied by music, dances and singing. Also when new caciques were installed as rulers of their territories music and dances were performed.

When the Muisca were constructing their houses (bohíos), they sang and danced and moved the wood for their houses according to the rhythm of the music. They dressed up with golden diadems and drank a lot of chicha. During these rituals they were accompanied by their god of construction and drunkenness, Nencatacoa.

The Muisca raft depicts a cacique surrounded by assistants, two of whom are carrying rattles as part of the musical accompaniment for a ceremony at Lake Guatavita.

=== Instruments ===
For their music the Muisca used mainly flutes, drums and fotutos; musical instruments made of shells or snails. They also used ocarinas. The Muisca also used zampoñas and rattling cups with a pebble inside for their musical compositions.

=== Dance ===
The dances for the harvest and sowing periods of the Muisca calendar were performed with feathers and costumes representing bears, jaguars and other animals. The dances performed when they were constructing their houses were mixed-gender; women and men danced holding hands.

== See also ==
- Muisca art
- Indigenous music of North America
- Maya music
- Andean music
