= Cuchavira =

God of the rainbow in the Muisca religion of South America

- Rainbow
- Member of Muisca religion
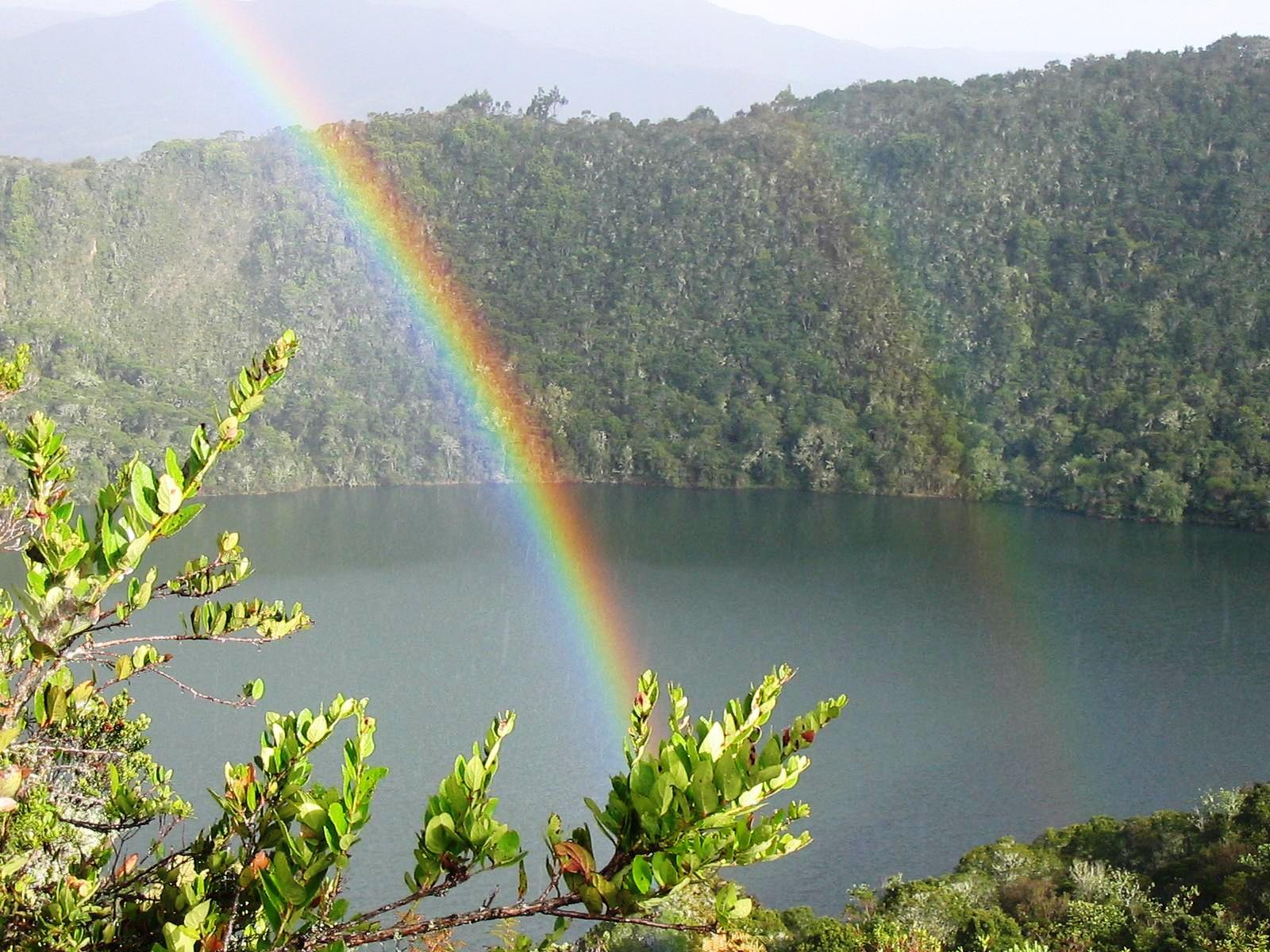
- Cuchavira at sacred Lake Guatavita
- Other names: Cuchaviva
- Affiliation: Chibchacum (rain); Sué (Sun)
- Region: Altiplano Cundiboyacense
- Ethnic group: Muisca

Equivalents
- Greek: Iris

Cuchavira or Cuchaviva is the rainbow deity, protector of working women and the sick in the religion of the Muisca. The Muisca and their confederation were one of the advanced civilizations of the Americas and in the fertile intermontane valley that forms the Altiplano Cundiboyacense in the Andes rain and sun were both very important for their agriculture. Moreover, in those days the Bogotá savanna consisted of various swamps and floodings were regular.

== Description ==
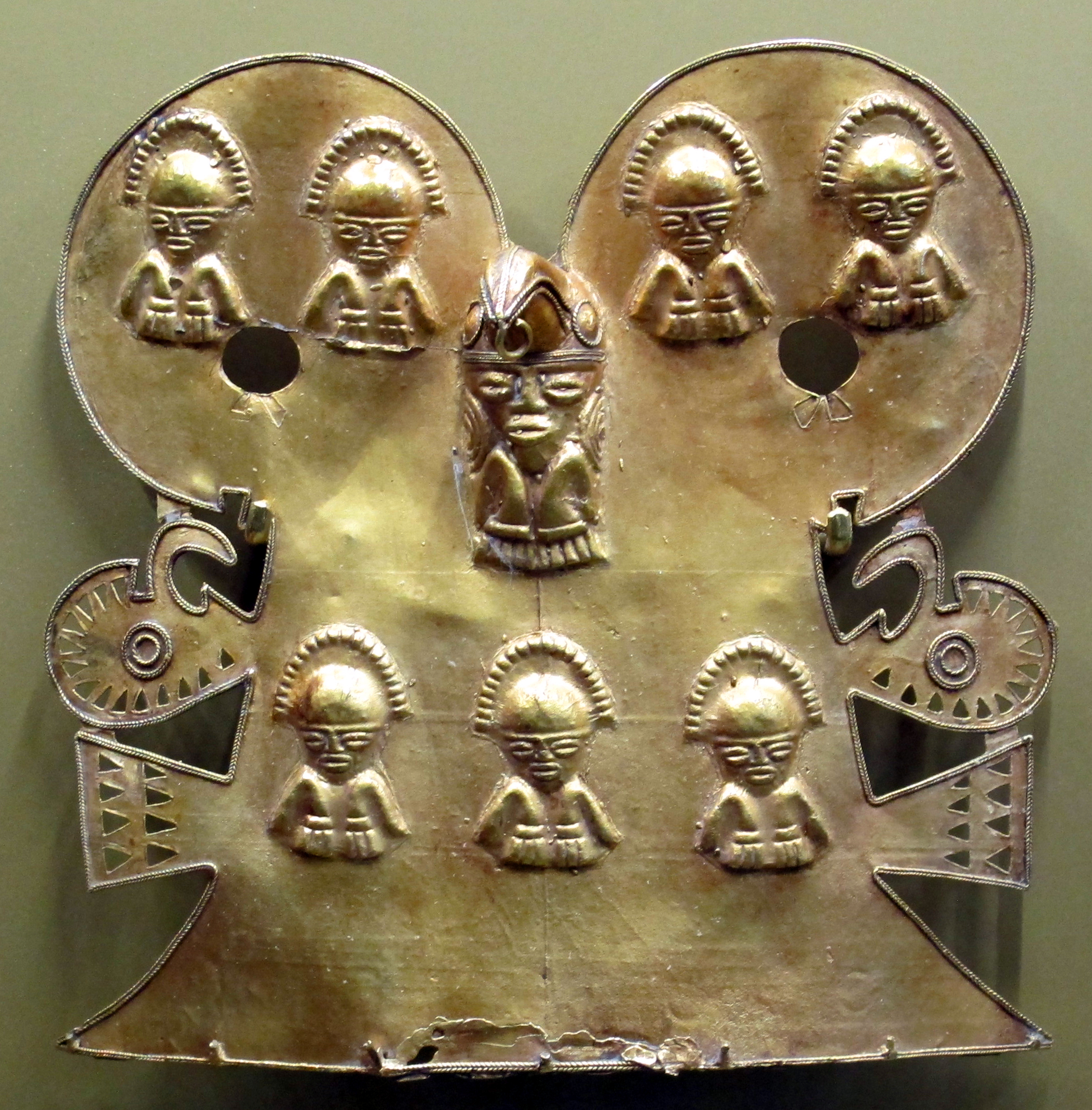
Tumbaga, a gold-copper alloy used for offerings and crafts Museo del Oro, Bogotá

Cuchavira, which means "shining air", appeared before the Muisca when Bochica, the messenger of the supreme being Chiminigagua was sent to the plains of the Muisca. Also when rain god Chibchacum was angry, he sent heavy rains to the flatlands, causing the rivers to flood, destroying the agriculture and the houses (bohíos) of the Muisca. When the rains were over and the Sun was shining again, causing Cuchavira to appear, the people offered low-grade gold or gold-copper alloys (tumbaga), marine snails and small emeralds to thank him.

== Gallery ==
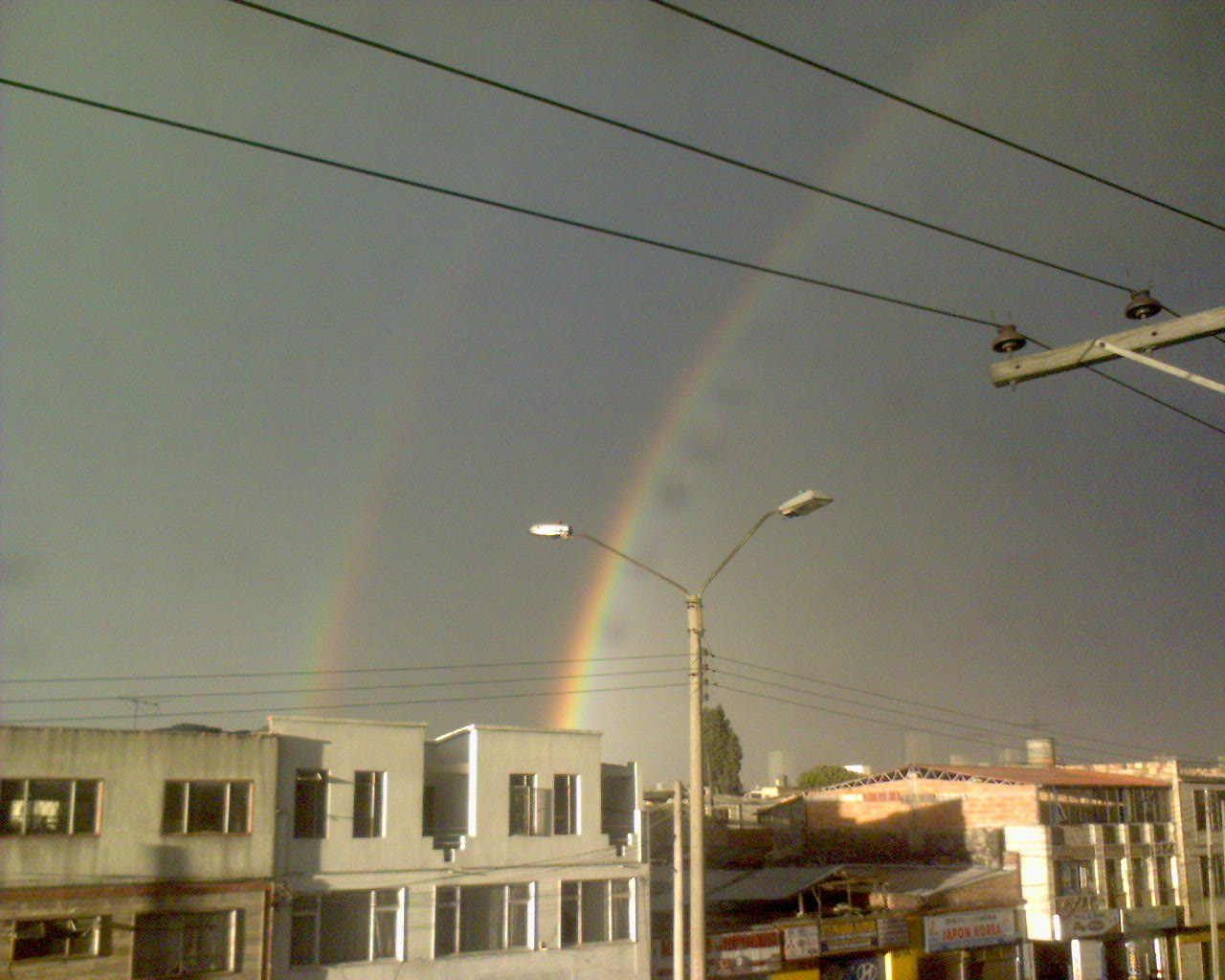
Bogotá

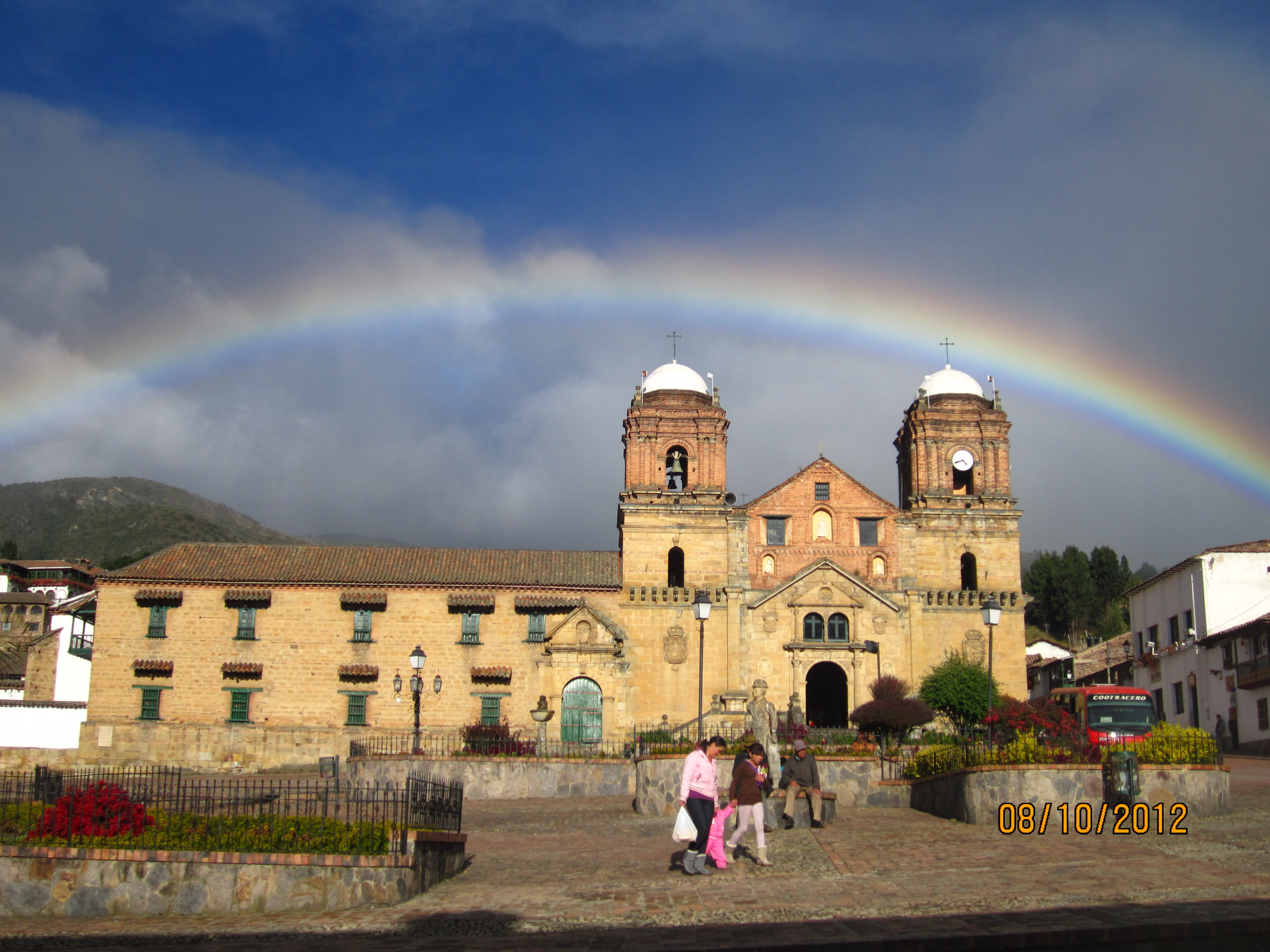
Monguí

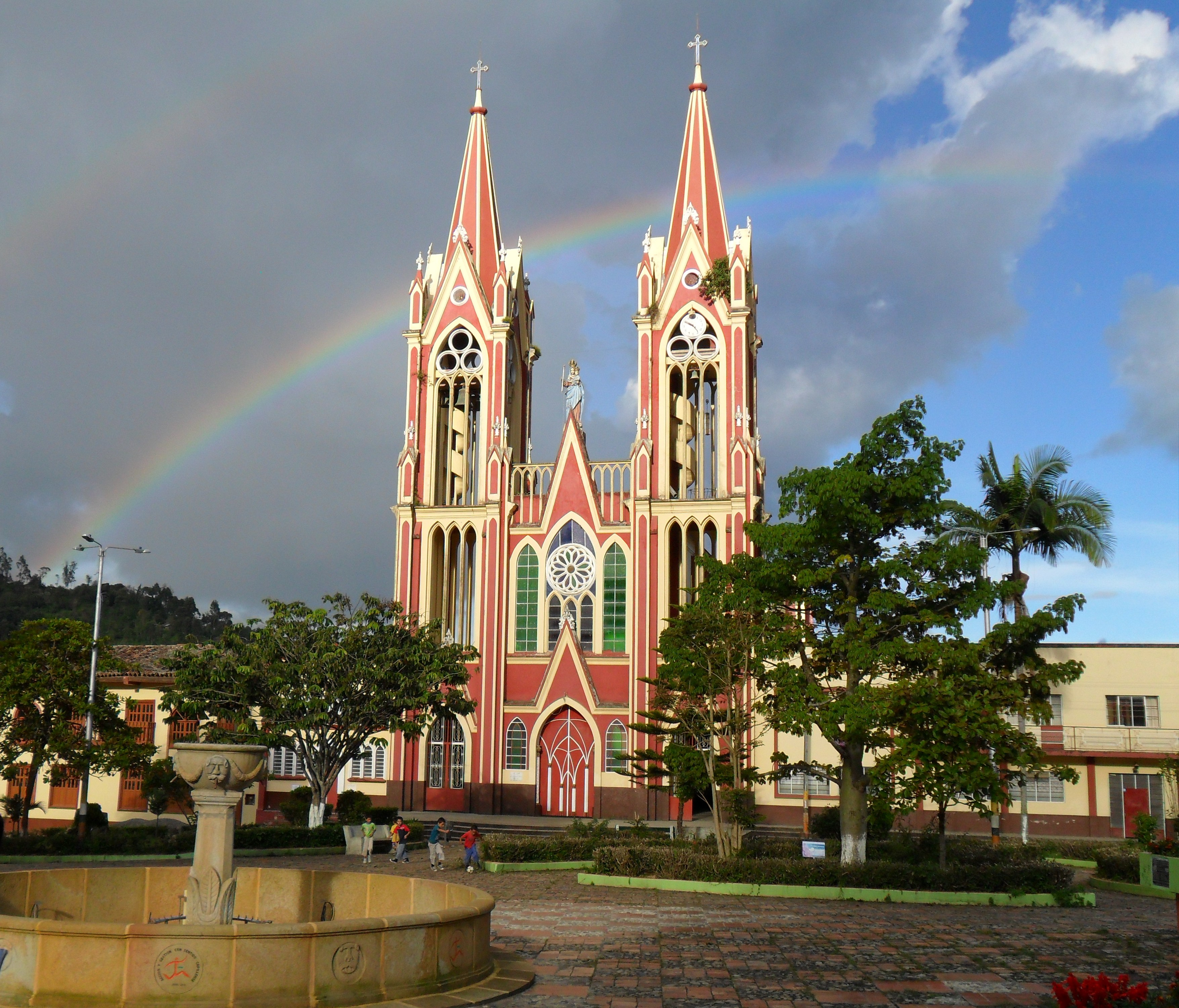
La Capilla

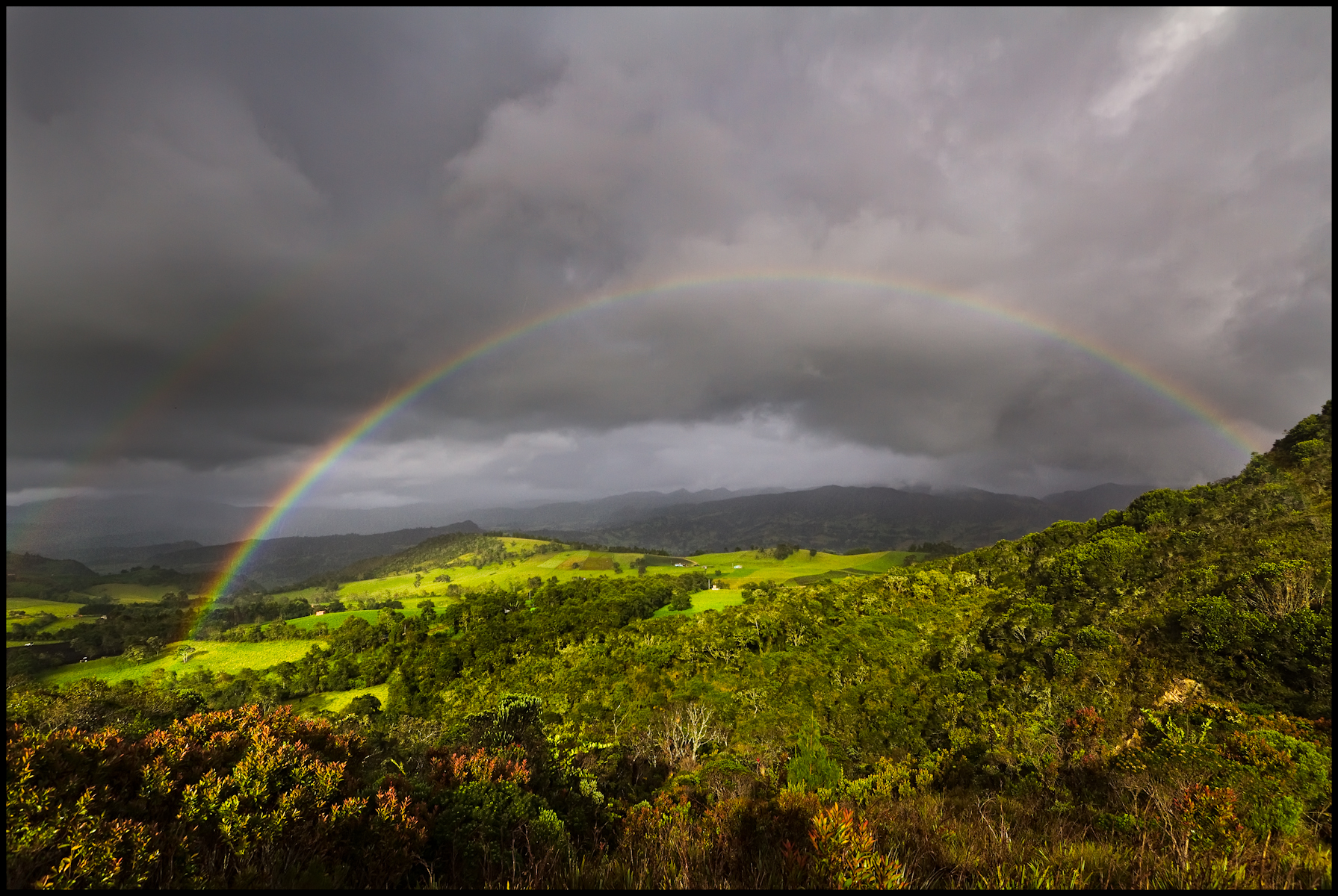
Guatavita

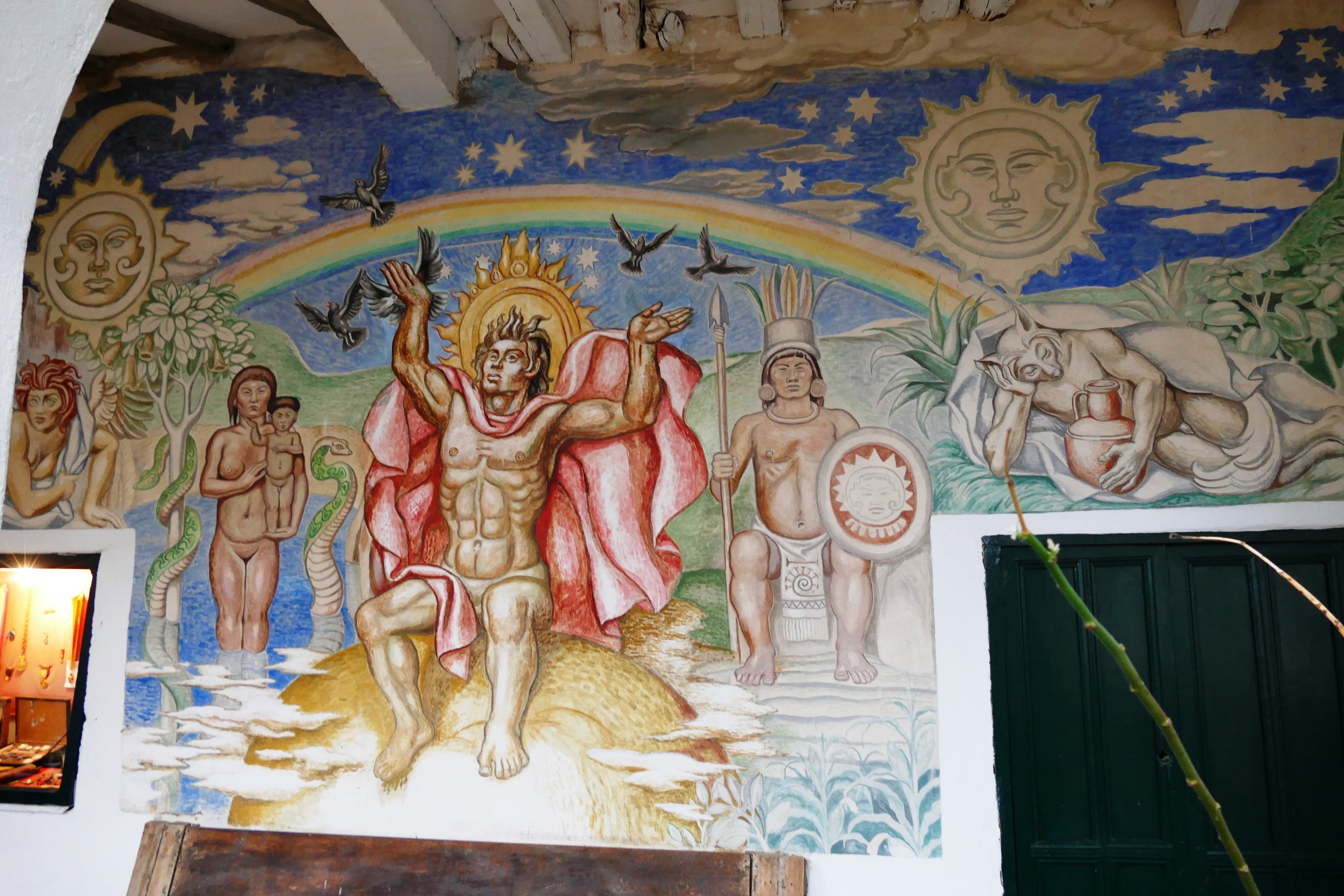
Tunja

== See also ==
- Nencatacoa
