= Chibchacum =

God of rain and thunder in the Muisca religion of South America

- Rain, Storms, Thunder, Lightning and Earthquakes
- Member of Muisca religion
- Other names: Chichebachun
- Affiliation: Sué (Sun); Cuchavira (rainbow); Chaquén (fertility)
- Region: Altiplano Cundiboyacense
- Ethnic group: Muisca

Chibchacum or Chichebachun is the rain and thunder god in the religion of the Muisca who inhabited the Altiplano Cundiboyacense in pre-Columbian times.

== Description ==
In myth, when Chibchacum was angry, he sent heavy rains to the flatlands, causing the rivers to flood, destroying the agriculture and the houses (bohíos) of the Muisca. When the rains were over and the Sun was shining again, causing Cuchavira to appear, the people offered low-grade gold or gold-copper alloys (tumbaga), marine snails and small emeralds to thank him.

One tale tells how the Muisca venerated a rock and worshipped Bochica. Chibchacum was very angry and rebelled against Bochica. He went down to Earth and noticed a woman, Chié coming to get some water. Chibchacum wooed her into joining his rebellion, promising that Chié would be his queen once Bochica was finished. Chié joined, and soon everybody was fighting, believing that they were better than others and lying. This caused a civil war. Chié was cursed by Bochica and was turned into a barn owl. His plan foiled, Chibchacum plotted his revenge. He had his revenge by speaking an evil incantation causing a huge flood. The people screamed to Bochica telling them to let them live and in return they would worship Bochica. So, once Bochica created a great waterfall to wash away the floodwaters, he knew he had to punish Chibchacum. Bochica cursed Chibchacum by forcing him to carry Mother Earth on his back. To this day the Muisca believe that when there is an earthquake, it is Chibchacum shifting his heavy load.

== See also ==
- Chibafruime
- Atlas, forced to hold up the sky in Greek mythology
- Loki, believed to cause earthquakes in Norse mythology
