= Chibafruime =

God of war in the Muisca religion of South America

- War
- Member of Muisca religion
- Other names: Chibrafruime
- Region: Altiplano Cundiboyacense
- Ethnic group: Muisca

Equivalents
- Greek: Athena, Ares
- Roman: Mars

Chibafruime, also spelled as Chibrafruime, was a minor deity in the religion of the Muisca. It was the god of war. Mythological tales about Chibafruime have been noted in Bojacá, Bosa, Guatavita, Turmequé and Cajicá.

Little is known about Chibafruime and his appearance, which may have been in the shape of a jaguar. The Muisca were more traders than warriors. Their negotiation skills were admired by the conquistadors who made first contact with the Muisca.

Scholar Lucas Fernández de Piedrahita has provided the little information about Chibafruime.
