= Sué =

Muisca god of the sun

- Sun
- Member of Muisca religion
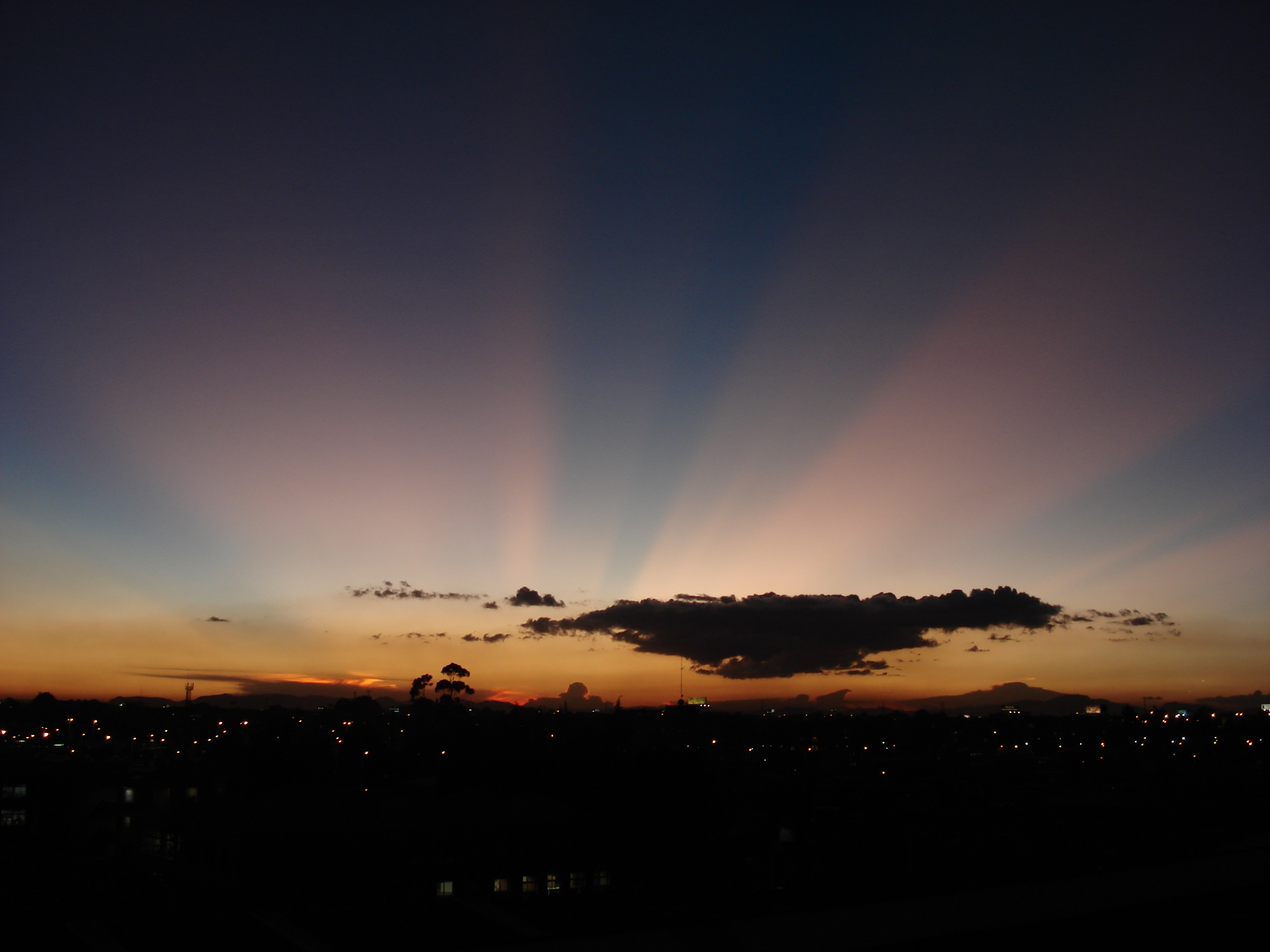
- Sué setting behind Bogotá
- Other names: Xué, Sua, Zuhe, Suhé
- Affiliation: Chiminigagua (light); Cuchavira (rainbow); Chibchacum (rain)
- Major cult center: Sun Temple, Sugamuxi
- Day: Summer solstice
- Region: Altiplano Cundiboyacense
- Ethnic group: Muisca
- Consort: Chía (Moon)

Equivalents
- Etruscan: Usil
- Greek: Helios
- Hindu: Surya
- Norse: Sól
- Roman: Sol
- Slavic: Dazhbog

Sué, Xué, Sua, Zuhe or Suhé (from the Chibcha *[sua] "sun") was the god of the Sun in the religion of the Muisca. He was married to Moon goddess Chía. The Muisca and their confederation were one of the four advanced civilizations of the Americas; they developed their own religion on the Altiplano Cundiboyacense in the Andes. Both the Sun and rain, impersonated by Chibchacum, were very important for their agriculture.

== Description ==
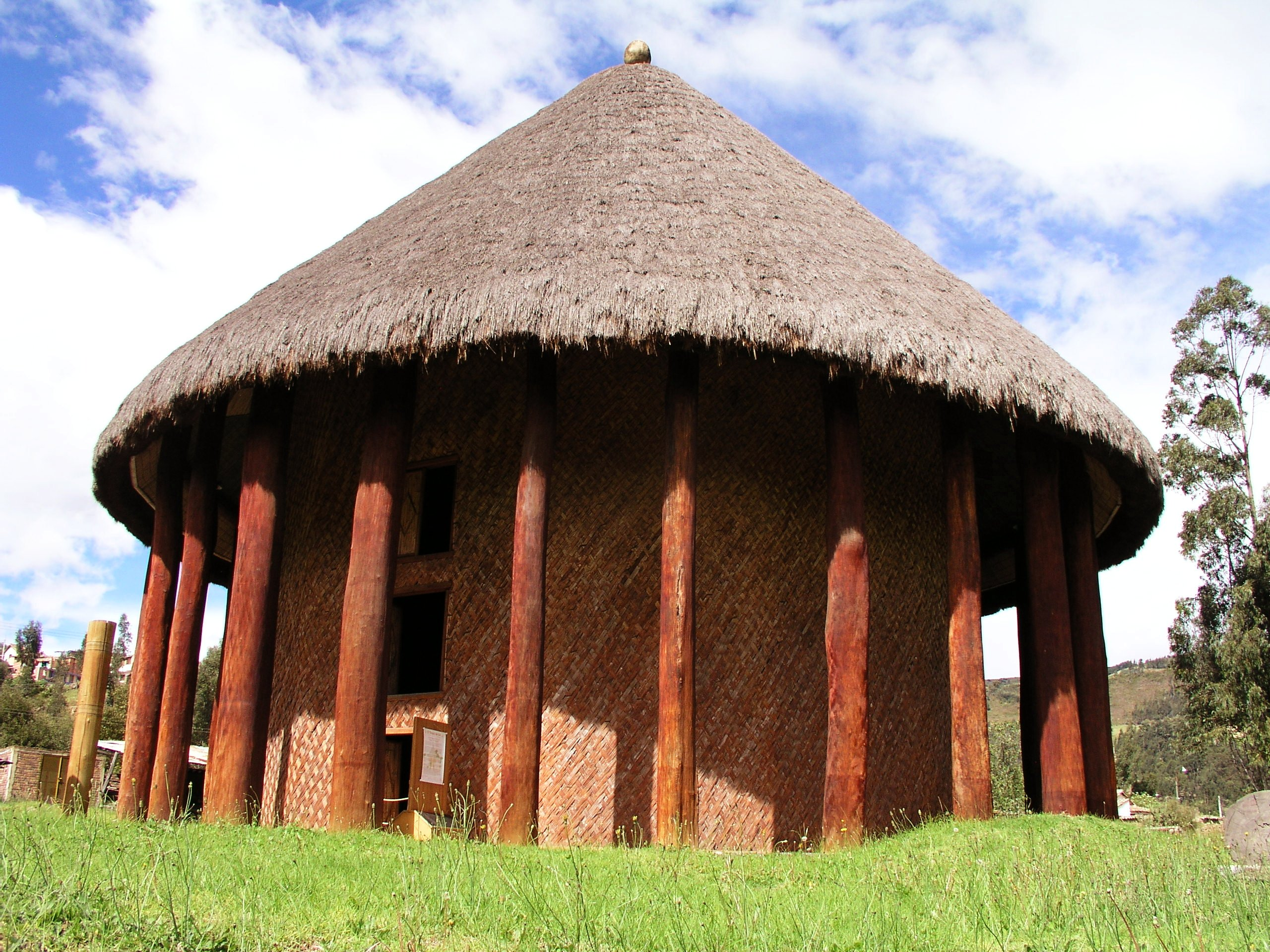
Reconstruction of the Sun Temple, place of worship to Sué Archeology Museum Sogamoso

After the creation of light and the world by Chiminigagua he created Chía and Sué to represent the Moon and the Sun respectively. Spanish conquistador Gonzalo Jiménez de Quesada wrote about the Muisca: "they have the Sun and the Moon as breeders of all the things and believe they are together as husband and wife having created the councils".

While Chía was related to the zipas of the southern Muisca Confederation, Sué was governing the zaques of the northern Muisca. Also the cacique of Ramiriquí was related to Sué.

Sué was worshipped in the Temple of the Sun in Sugamuxi, currently known as Sogamoso, City of the Sun. Other temples attributed to Sué were in Bacatá and Guatavita. The original Sun Temple in Sogamoso has been destroyed by torch fires of the Spanish conquerors.

On the date of the summer solstice, the Muisca nobles went in a procession to the temples where they made sacrifices to ask for blessings of the yearly harvests. The day was celebrated with grand fesitivies by the people who painted their bodies and got drunk with chicha. They also adored their own shadows as they believed that Sué gave them their own personal god that they carried with them all day.

== See also ==
- Nencatacoa
- List of solar deities
