= Moon Temple (Chía) =

Muisca temple for the worship of Chía

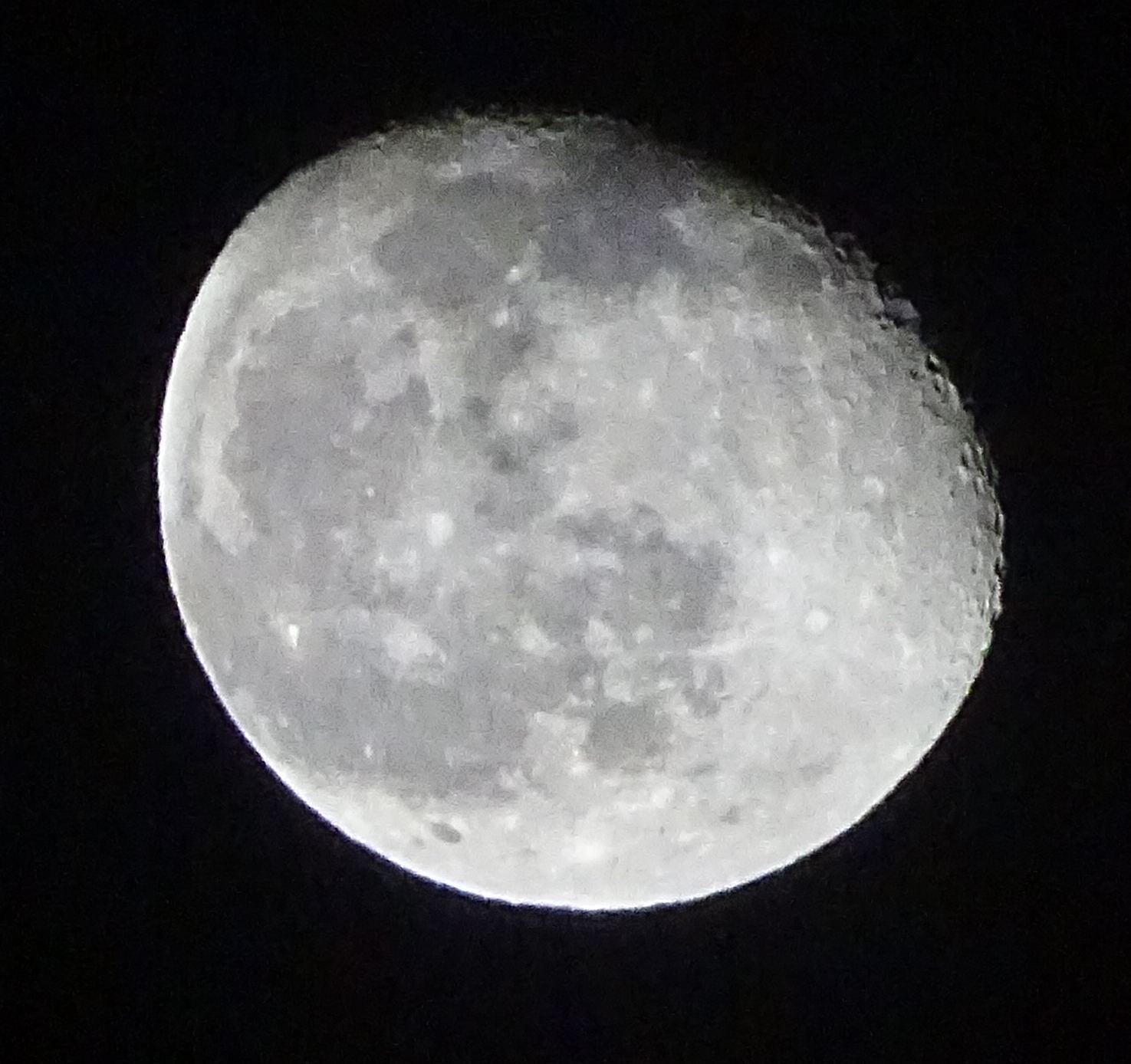
- Chía rising over the Bogotá savanna

- Location within Colombia
- 4°52′11.76″N 74°05′14.30″W
- Type: Temple
- Periods: Late Muisca
- Cultures: Muisca
- Satellite of: Bacatá
- Location: Chía, Cundinamarca
- Region: Bogotá savanna Altiplano Cundiboyacense, Colombia
- Part of: Muisca sites

History
- Abandoned: Spanish conquest

Site notes
- Elevation: 2,636 m (8,648 ft)
- Condition: Destroyed

The Moon Temple of Chía was a temple constructed by the Muisca as a place of worship for their Moon goddess Chía. The temple was built in Chía, Cundinamarca, Colombia, then part of the Muisca Confederation. It was one of the most important temples in the religion of the Muisca. The temple was destroyed during the Spanish conquest of the Muisca on the Altiplano Cundiboyacense. Little is known about the temple built on the Tíquiza Hill in western Chía bordering Tabio.

== Structure and worship ==
Coat of arms of Chía; City of the Moon

The Temple of the Moon was built on the Tíquiza Hill west of the urban center of Chía. The Muisca had an advanced knowledge of astronomy and constructed various sites across their territories. El Infiernito, just outside Villa de Leyva has survived, while the Sun Temple of Sugamuxi has been reconstructed. Just like the Sun Temple, the Moon temple was constructed according to the positions of the respective celestial body.

At the temple rituals were organized by the caciques and zipas of the Muisca Confederation. The caciques and priests at the Moon Temple wore white robes, different from those at the Sun Temple that were red. The Moon Temple not only formed a place of worship, also education to the new caciques and Muisca rulers was provided near the temple (Seminario de la Cuca).

== Other moon temples in the world ==
- Pyramid of the Moon - Aztec religion
- San Gervasio - Maya religion
- Temple of the Moon - Inca religion
- Temple of the Moon - China
- Somnath - Hinduism

== See also ==
- Muisca religion
- Chía - goddess of the Moon of the Muisca
- Sun Temple, Cojines del Zaque, Piedras del Tunjo
