= Chiminigagua =

Creator god in the religion of the Muisca people of Colombia

- Supreme being Creator of the world
- Member of Muisca religion
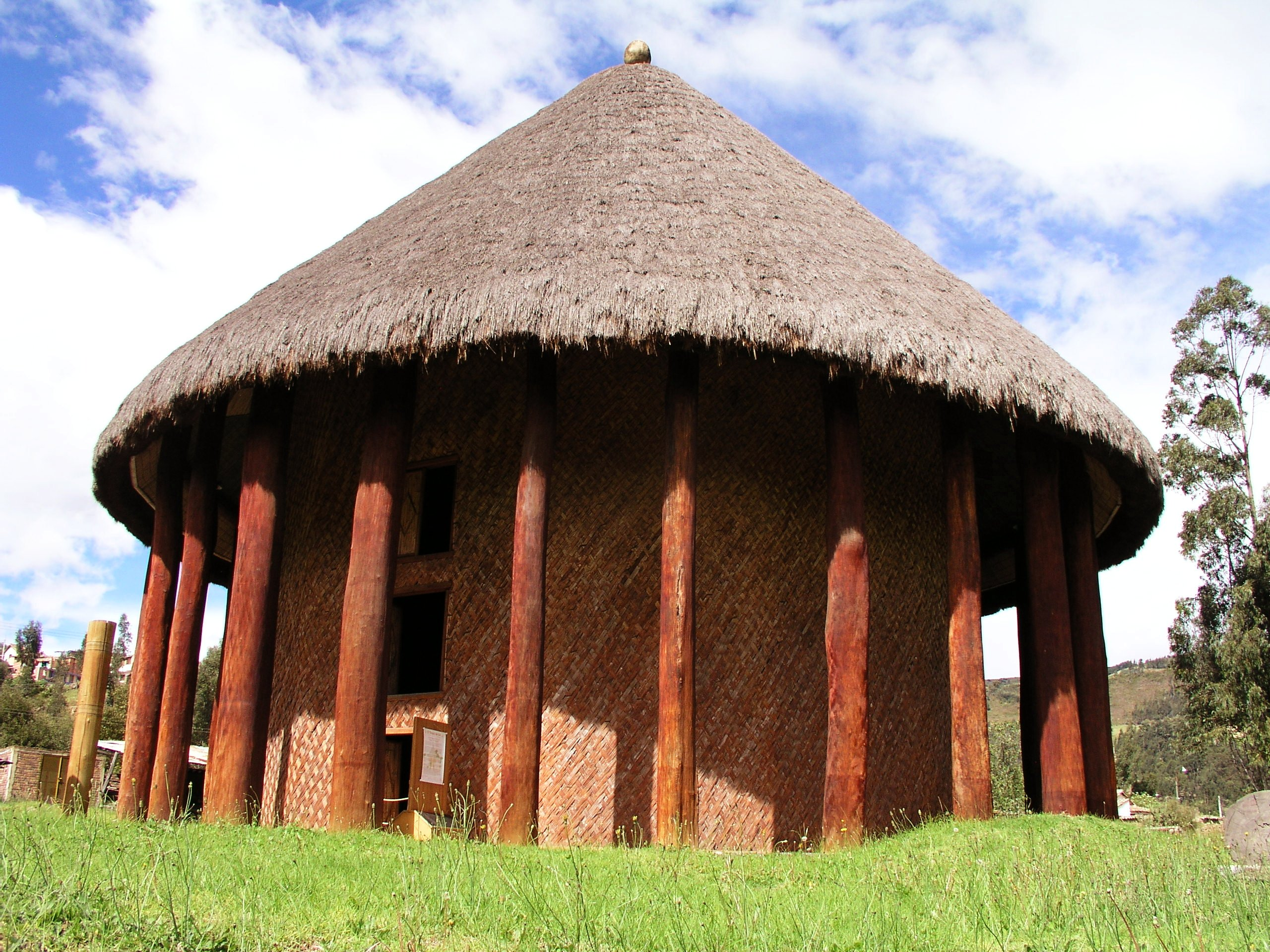
- Sun Temple, place of worship to Chiminigagua
- Other names: Chiminichagua, Chimichagua
- Affiliation: Bachué, Bochica
- Region: Altiplano Cundiboyacense; Colombia
- Ethnic group: Muisca
- Offspring: Chía, Sué, Cuchavira

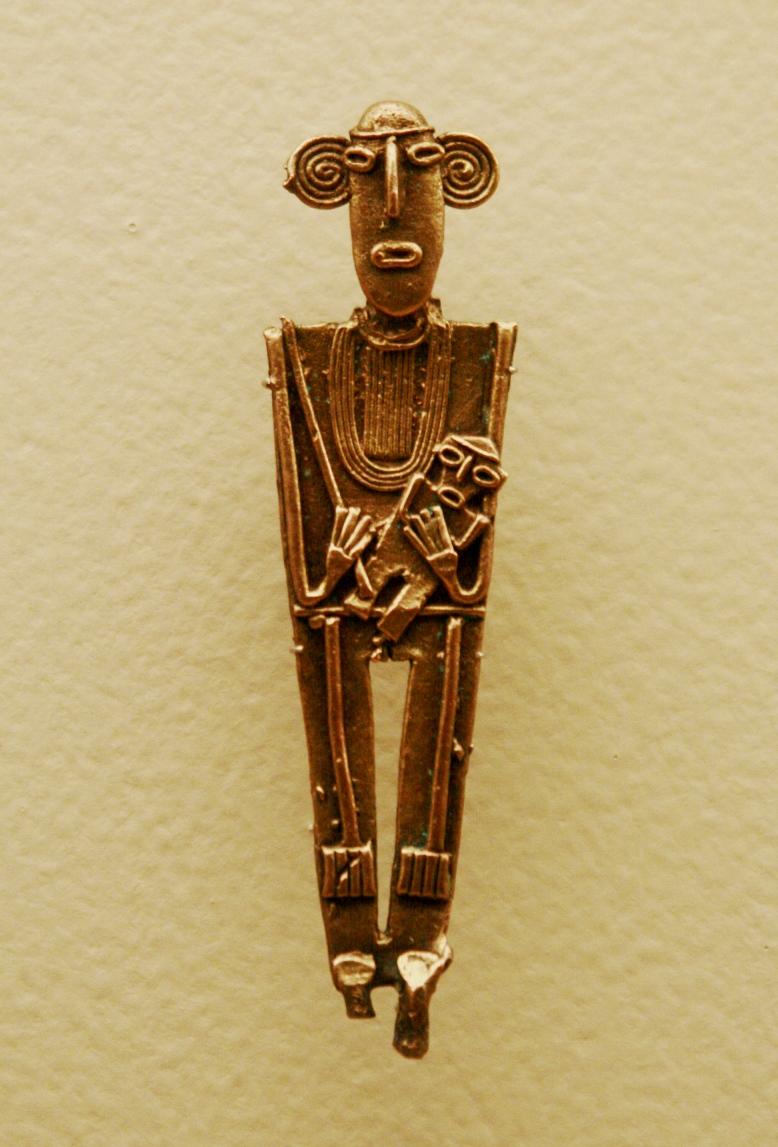
Tunjo of a mother with child in her arms, in gold These objects were thrown in water bodies at ceremonies to creator god Chiminichagua. Gold Museum, Bogotá.

Chiminigagua, Chiminichagua or Chimichagua (from Muisca, pronunciation reconstructed as *[ʂiminiɣaɣua]) was the supreme being, omnipotent god and creator of the world in the religion of the Muisca. The Muisca and their confederation were one of the four advanced civilizations of the Americas and developed their own religion on the Altiplano Cundiboyacense in the Andes.

== Description ==
Chiminigagua was a universally good god and represented the only light that existed when it was night time. When the world was created there was only darkness and the only light was given by Chiminigagua. When Chiminigagua decided to shine light across the Universe, she first opened her gigantic belly from where light was shining. She then created two large black birds and launched them into space. The birds spread light from their beaks which produced light in the cosmos. Thus she created light and everything in the world. Chiminigagua showed the importance of her important gods Chía (the Moon), Sué (the Sun) and Cuchavira (rainbow). Adoring the Moon and the Sun for the Muisca was praising Chiminigagua. The creation of the Sun and Moon gave rise to mother goddess Bachué.

The solar cult and belief in the supreme being is comparable to other indigenous peoples of the Americas and elsewhere in the world. Tezcatlipoca was a similar deity for the Aztec and Viracocha was his counterpart for the Incas. Quetzalcoatl and Huitzilopochtli represented the Sun for the Aztec and the Mayas praised Kinich Ahau, while the Incas believed Inti symbolised the Sun and created the Inca civilization.

The most important sanctuaries established in pre-Columbian Colombia were erected in Sugamuxi, present-day Sogamoso, Guatavita, Bacatá (now the Colombian capital Bogotá) and Guachetá. Zaque Goranchacha constructed a temple in Hunza, today known as Tunja, and honouring him the people placed the Cojines del zaque ("Zaque Pillows"), two circular stones made of the same rock, there. According to legends and oral accounts without archeological or anthropological evidences, the ceremonies were every day before sunrise: the zaque with his priests and some of the indigenous people gathered and prayed the Sun would rise in the east. This gave the astronomer class power over the peasants during eclipses. the ruler of the Muisca kneeled down on the Pillows and the people prayed, sang and danced.

Sogamoso was considered a sacred city in the Eastern Ranges of the Colombian Andes and was known as the "City of the Sun", blessed by Bochica. It was here the pilgrims gathered to adore Chiminigagua. When the Spanish conquistadores led by Gonzalo Jiménez de Quesada reached the area of the Muisca they were searching for gold and the legendary El Dorado. Their torches burnt the sacred Sun Temple, destroying one of the most elaborated religious works of the Muisca. The Sun Temple has been reconstructed in the Archeology Museum of Sogamoso, see image.

Chiminigagua was described at the end of the 16th century by the Spanish chroniclers Pedro Simón and Juan de Castellanos.

The supreme being of the Muisca was a static deity without body who ruled over all the other gods. She was however never praised directly, yet through her lesser gods of the Sun, Moon and fertility; Chía, Sué and Chaquén. Chiminigagua's messenger god was Bochica. When the Spanish arrived in Muisca territory they were described as "children of the Sun".

== See also ==
- Muisca
- Muisca religion
