= Chía (goddess) =

Triple goddess from the Muisca religion of South America

- Moon
- Member of Muisca religion
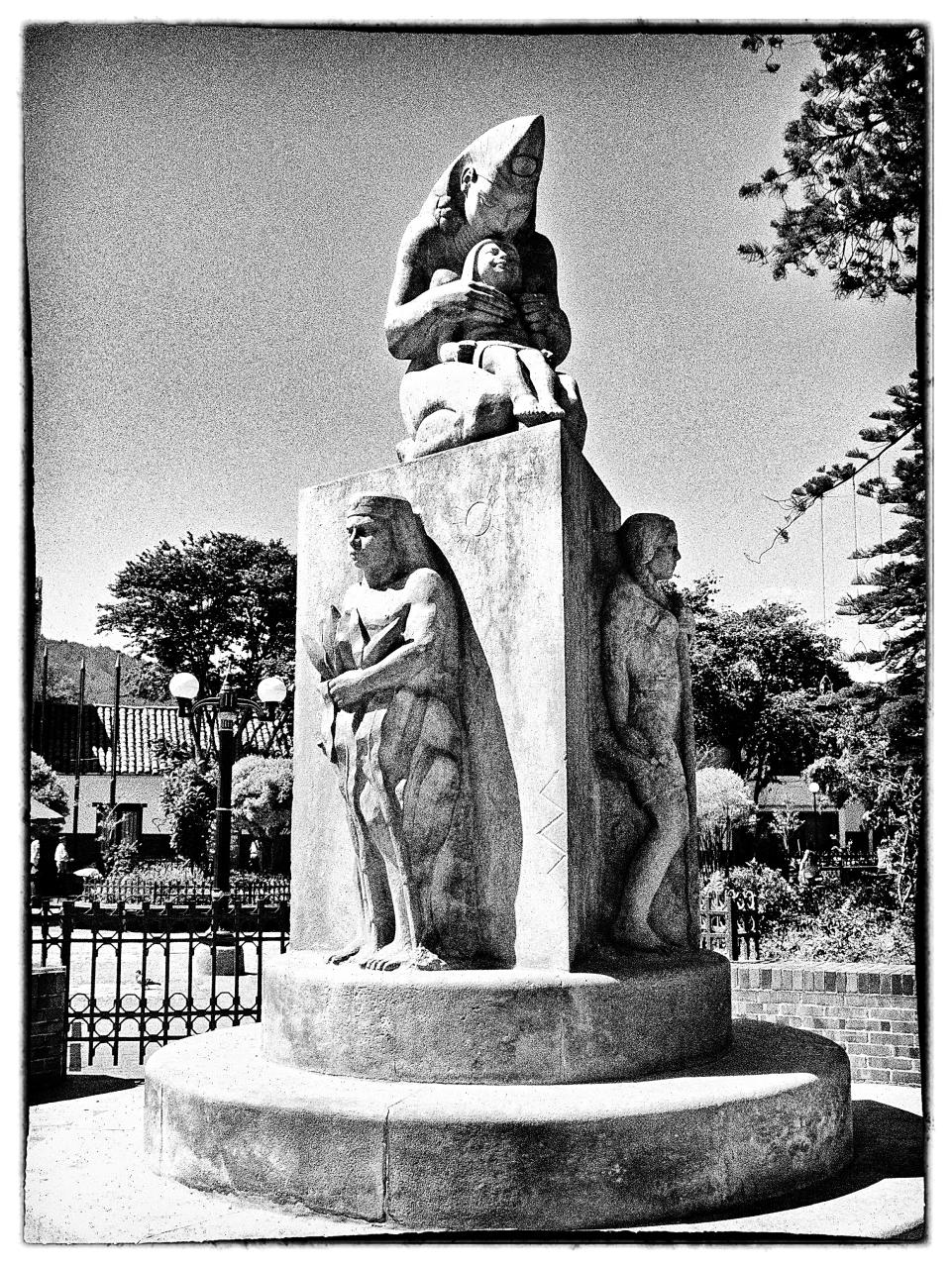
- Statue of Chía in Chía
- Major cult center: Moon Temple, Chía
- Planet: Moon
- Region: Altiplano Cundiboyacense
- Ethnic group: Muisca
- Consort: Sué (Sun)

Equivalents
- Greek: Selene
- Hindu: Chandra
- Norse: Máni
- Roman: Luna
- Slavic: Devana

The goddess Chía (from the Chibcha language *[ʂia] "the one who is like the moon"), is a triple lunar deity in the religion of the Muisca who inhabited the Altiplano Cundiboyacense in pre-Columbian times. Of central importance to the pantheon, she was worshipped across various Muisca lands.

In one of her many functions, Chía was considered to be the patron deity of the Zipa ruler, who governed the territory encompassing what is now Bogotá. Her ceremonial center was located in or around the city of Chía, Cundinamarca, which was aptly named after the goddess.

The chyquys; priests of the sacred calendar, were in charge of the ceremonies dedicated to the goddess, which included offerings of gold and ceramic artwork.

== Súe ==
Chía and Sué were the first generation of deities, created by Chiminigagua, in which they both illuminated light for earth. Chía and Súe, the solar deity, are married, but separated in the sky most of the time, until Chía would join with her husband creating a lunar eclipse.

== See also ==
- Moon Temple
- List of lunar deities
