= Muisca religion =

Indigenous religion of Colombia

Muisca religion describes the religion of the Muisca who inhabited the central highlands of the Colombian Andes before the Spanish conquest of the Muisca. The Muisca formed a confederation of holy rulers and had a variety of deities, temples and rituals incorporated in their culture. The supreme being in the Muisca religion was Chiminigagua who created light and the Earth. He was not directly honoured, but rather worship was directed to Chía, goddess of the Moon, and her husband Sué, god of the Sun. The representation of the two main celestial bodies as husband and wife showed the complementary character of man and woman and the sacred status of marriage.

The Muisca worshipped their gods at sacred sites, both natural, such as Lake Guatavita, the Siecha Lakes and Lake Tota and constructed; the Sun and Moon Temples in respectively Suamox (the "Rome" or "Mecca" of the Muisca) and Chía, City of the Moon. During these rituals the priests, obgues, performed sacrifices, sometimes human in character. The last public religious ceremony of the Muisca was performed in Ubaque on December 27, 1563.

Knowledge about the Muisca religion was brought to Europe by conquistador Gonzalo Jiménez de Quesada and soldier Juan de Castellanos in the 16th century and by bishop Lucas Fernández de Piedrahita and friar Pedro Simón in the 17th century. Modern Muisca scholars who wrote about the religion of the inhabitants of the Altiplano Cundiboyacense are Javier Ocampo López and Eduard Londoño.

== Religious practices ==
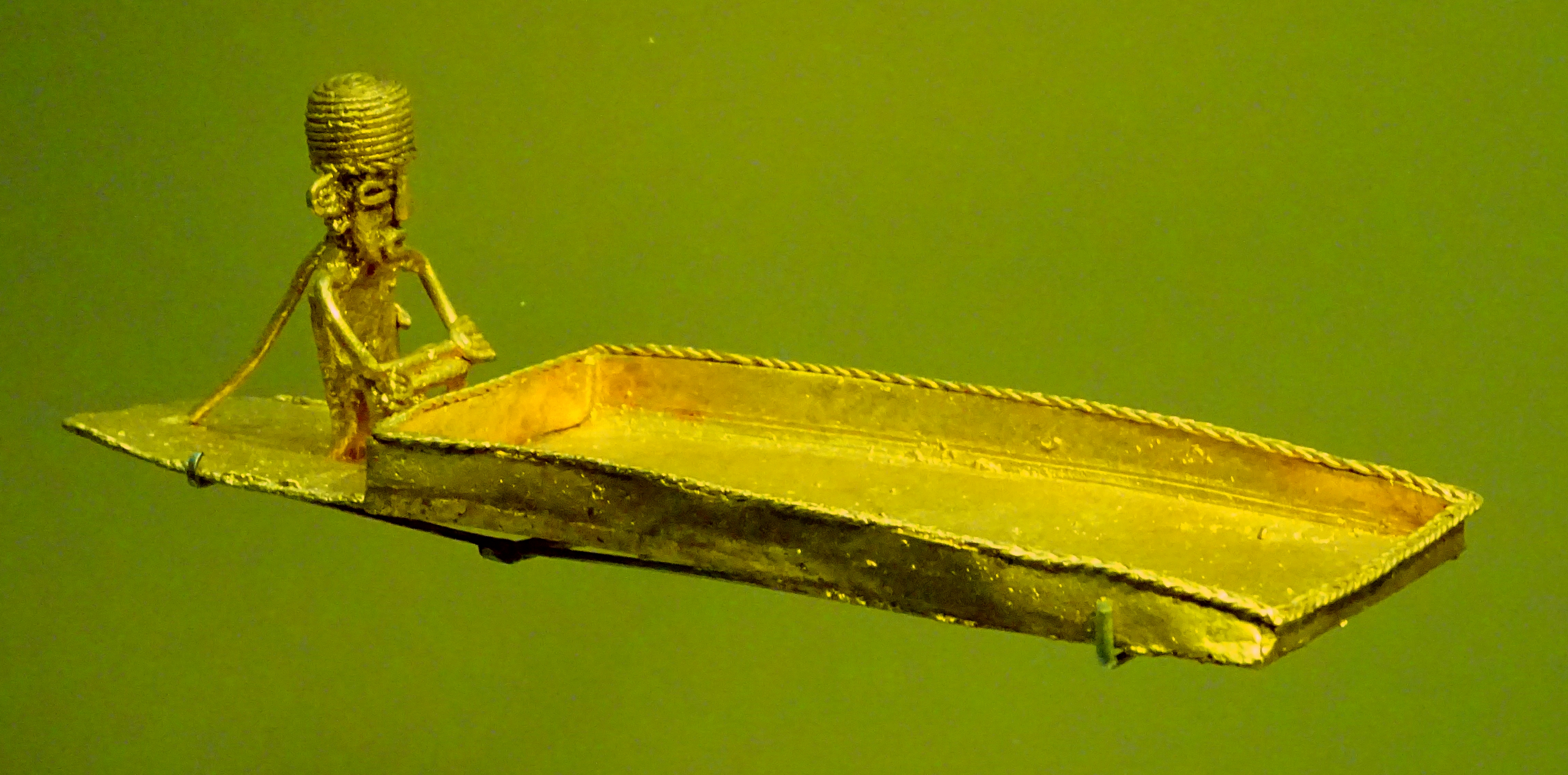
Golden yopo plate

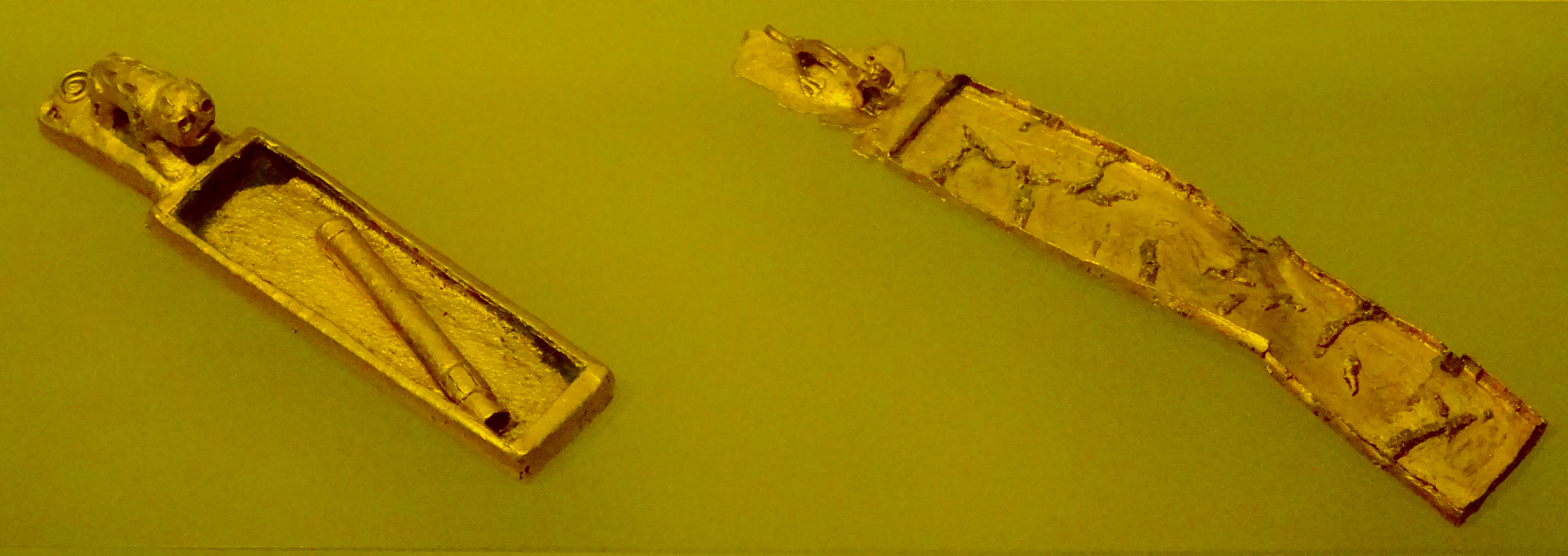
with inhalation tube

Decorated golden plates were used in the religious rituals to inhale crushed seeds of the yopo tree. The people used hollow tubes to inhale the psychoactive powder
Museo del Oro

The Muisca were deeply religious people and their rulers had a double role both as political and as religious leaders. The people fasted and also consumed coca, tobacco and yopo with their rituals. Yopo was extracted from Anadenanthera trees, growing in the Llanos Orientales, to the east of the Muisca territories. The psychoactive seeds of the tree were traded with the Achagua, Guayupe and Tegua and grinded and inhaled using a hollow bird bone or a spoon. The plates from which the yopo was inhaled were made of gold and tumbaga and well elaborated and decorated. Many of them have been found and are on display in the Museo del Oro. Coca was used in rituals of predictions and to heal diseases. The coca was combined with cal to increase the efficiency of the substance. The cal was saved in poporos, often made of gold or tumbaga.

== Deities ==
A variety of deities from their mythology have been described by the chroniclers.

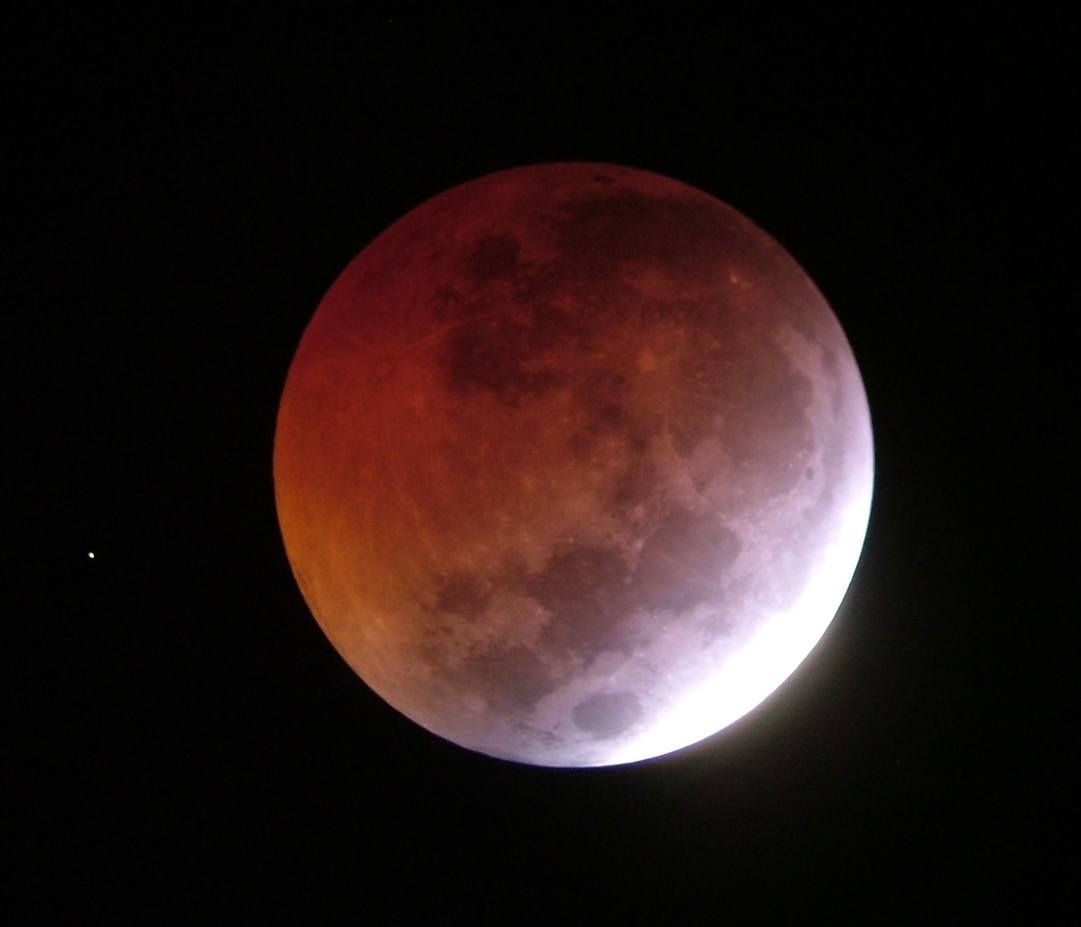
Chía joined with her husband Sué during a lunar eclipse

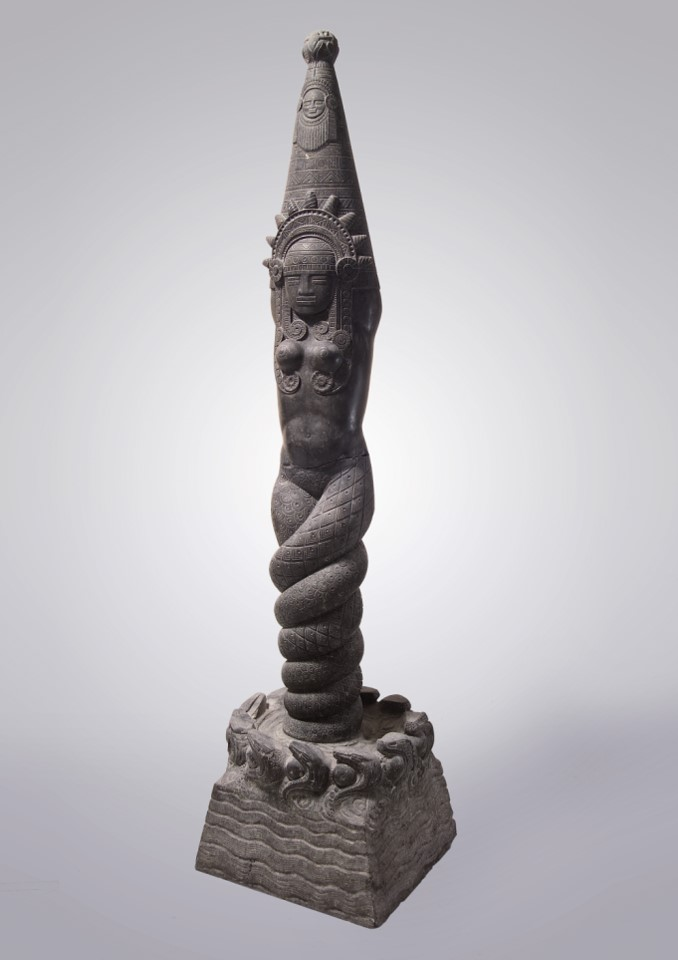
Bachué

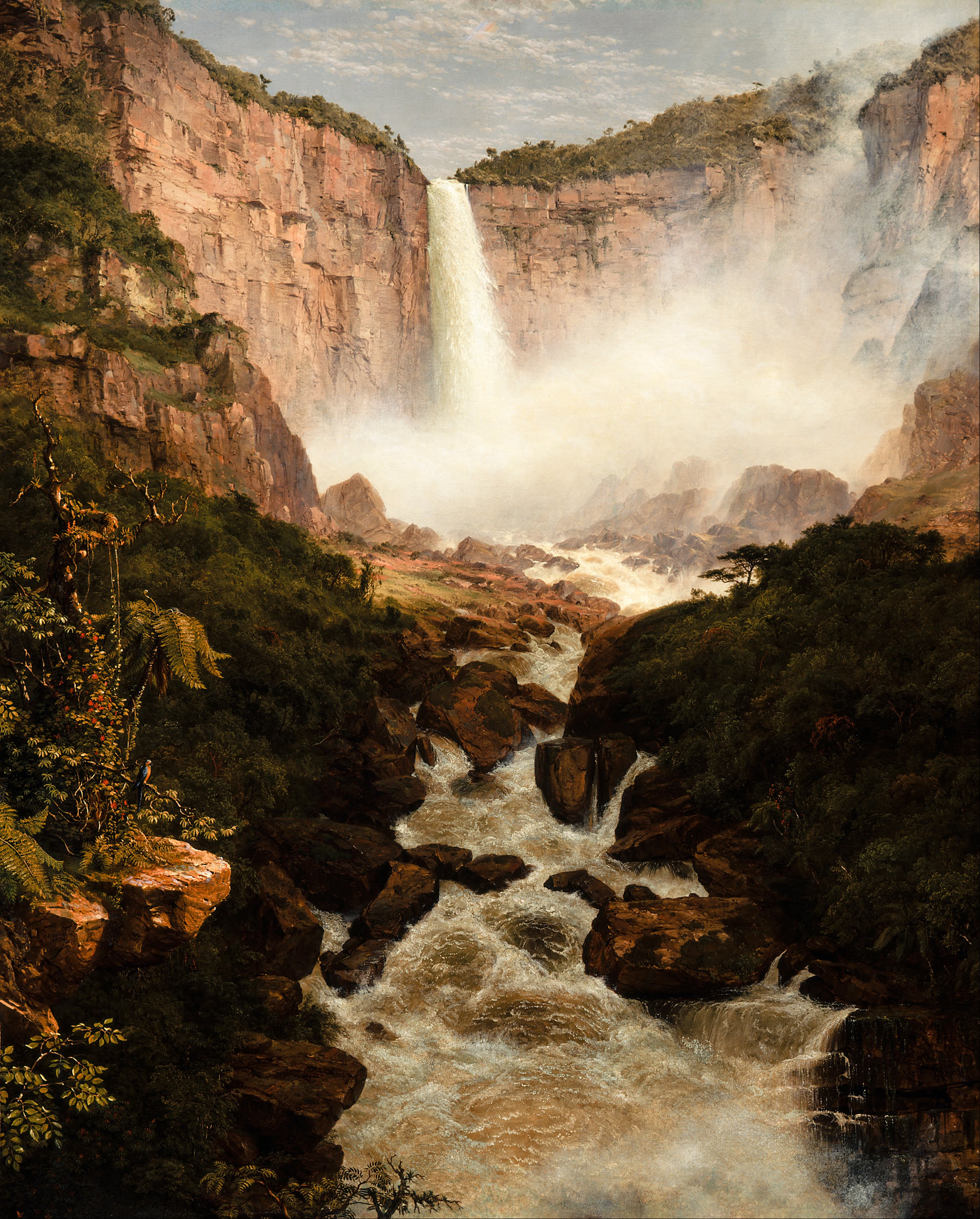
Tequendama Falls created by Bochica

=== Chiminigagua - Supreme Being ===
Chiminigagua was the creator god of the Muisca who made the light and the Earth. At the beginning of time it was all dark and Chiminigagua sent two large black birds into the skies. From their beaks the light was created and the cosmos illuminated.

=== Chía - goddess of the Moon ===
Chía was the goddess of the Moon and one of the two gods through which Chiminigagua was honoured. She represented fertility of the Earth and of the people. Chía was married to Súe.

=== Sué - god of the Sun ===
Súe was the god of the Sun, important for the agriculture of the Muisca. He and his wife Chía followed each other across the skies, forming the perfect couple in conjunction at New Moon and during solar and lunar eclipses.

=== Bachué - mother goddess ===
The ancestor of all the Muisca was Bachué, mother of humankind who emerged from Lake Iguague with a three-year-old boy in her arms. When the boy grew up, Bachué married her son and traveled around the Muisca territories. Everytime she was pregnant, she bore four to six children. The Muisca believed all the people could be traced back to Bachué. When her children got old, Bachué returned to Lake Iguague with her son and after a final speech they turned into two giant snakes who submerged in the water, making the site sacred for the Muisca.

=== Bochica - messenger god of civilization ===
Bochica was the messenger of Chiminigagua and holy teacher of the Muisca. He was an old bearded man sent from heaven to educate the people in weaving, mantle making, ceramics production and social, moral and political values. He settled in Suamox, where the people organized yearly religious festivities. In the religion of the Muisca, Bochica created the Tequendama Falls, a waterfall west of southern capital Bacatá.

=== Huitaca - rebelling goddess of sexual liberation ===
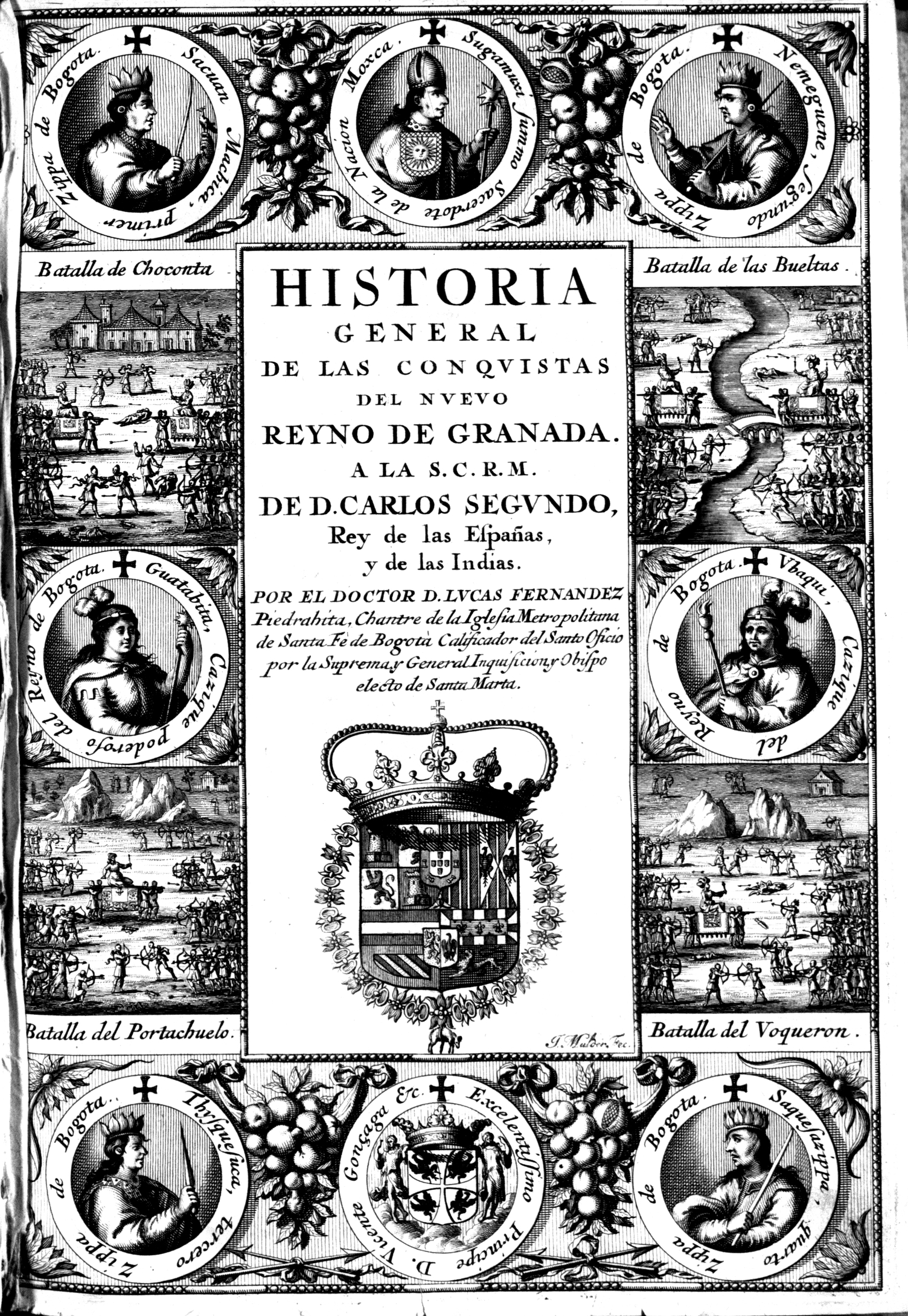
Lucas Fernández de Piedrahita, Historia general de las conquistas del Nuevo Reyno de Granada, 1688

Huitaca was the goddess of happiness, pleasure and sexual liberation who rebelled against Bochica. She used to be a beautiful woman teaching the people a long life full of arts and dances. When Bochica found out about her rebellion against his power, he turned Huitaca into a white owl, or alternatively, the moon.

=== Chibchacum - god of rain and thunder ===
God Chibchacum represented rain and thunder and protected the traders and the working people in general. He was the patron of Bacatá where the Muisca offered him gold. His revenge upon the people who disobeyed was flooding the Bogotá savanna. Bochica stepped in and ordered Chibchacum to carry the Earth on his shoulders, like Atlas in Ancient Greece. Chibchacum was also the god of the numerous earthquakes in the central Andes.

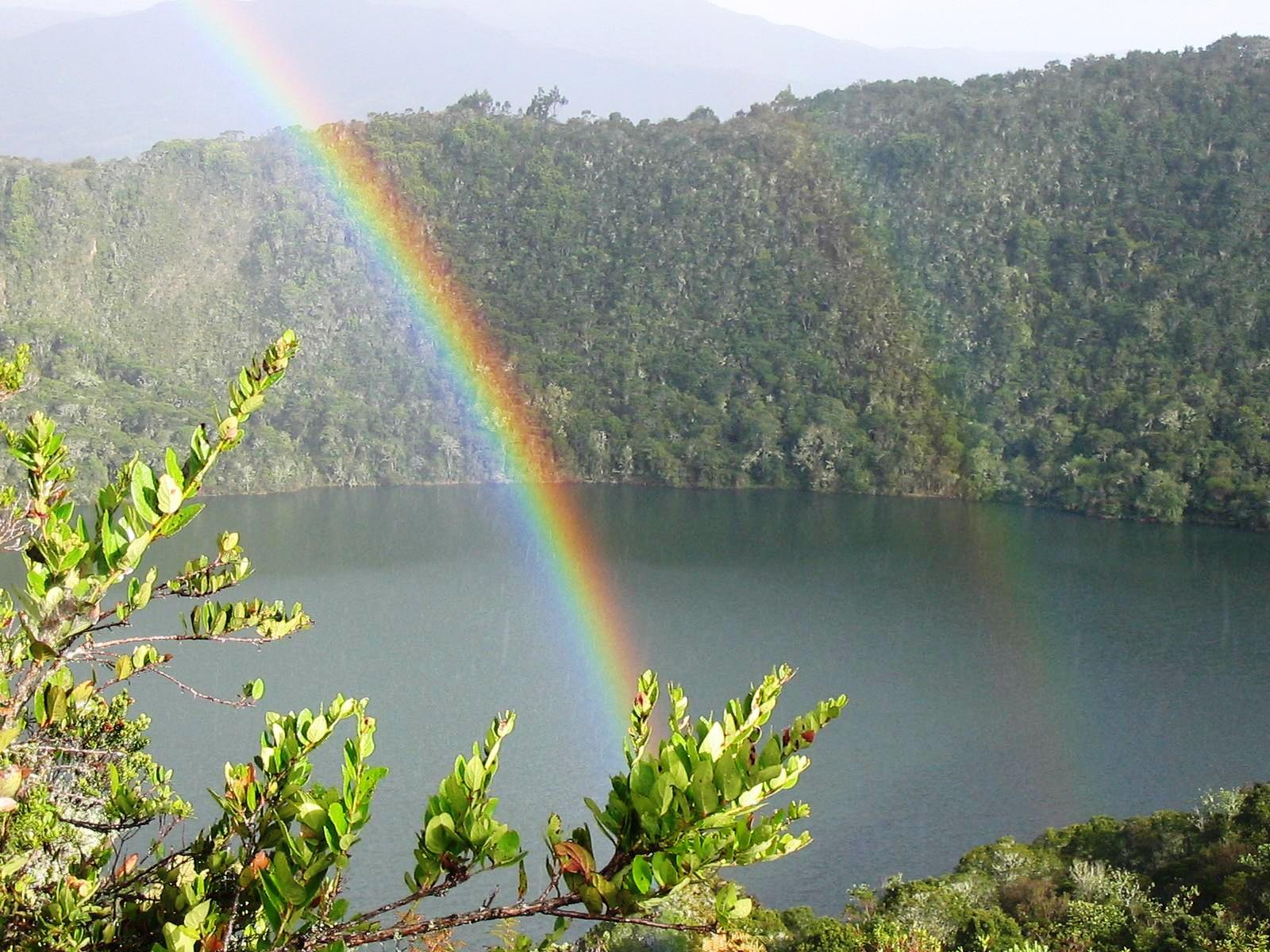
Cuchavira at sacred Lake Guatavita

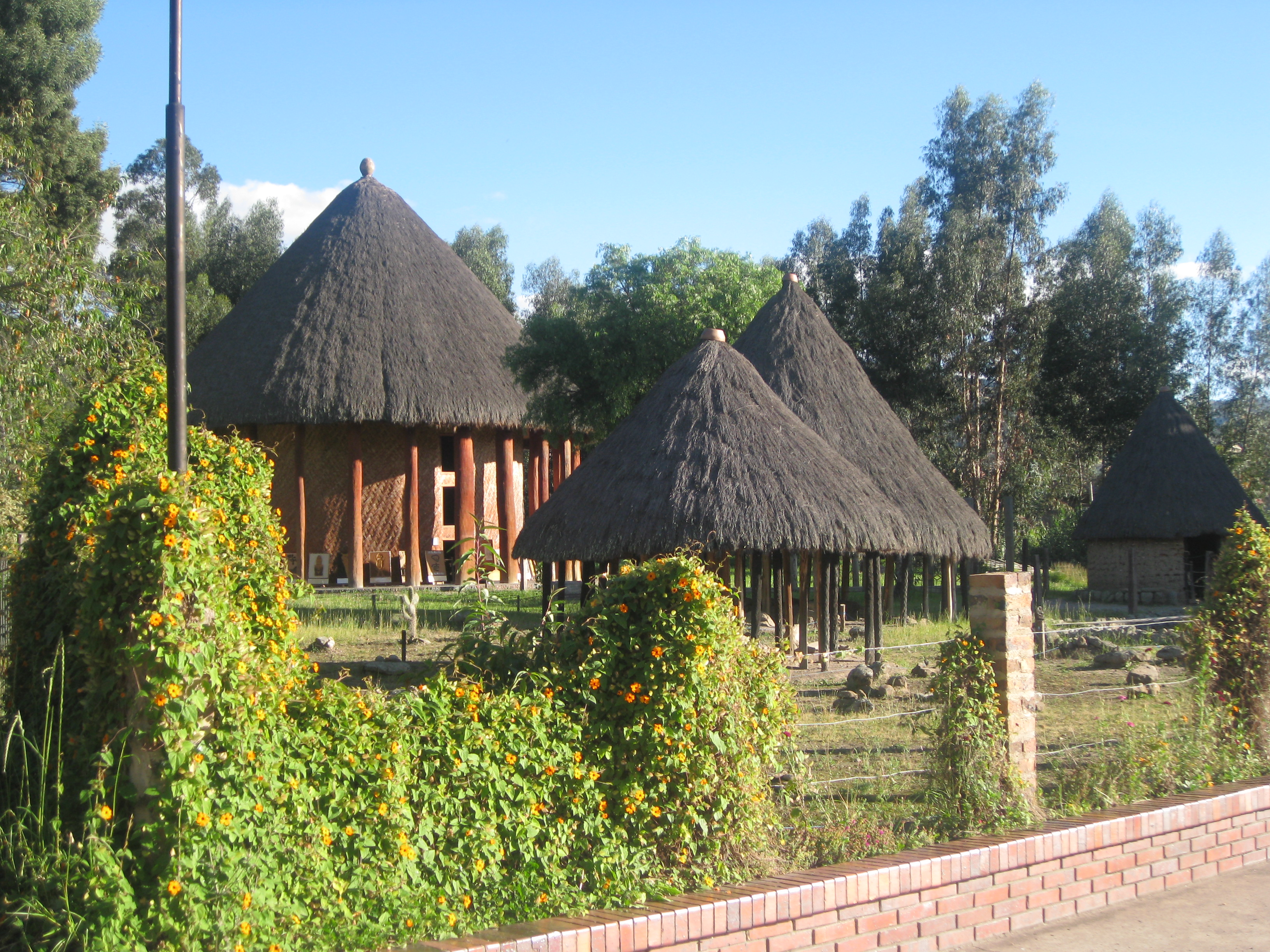
Nencatacoa helped the Muisca to build their bohíos (houses)

=== Cuchavira - god of the rainbow ===
The rainbow was represented by Cuchavira who was born when Bochica created the Tequendama Falls. He was honoured with gold and other sacrifices.

=== Chaquén - god of sports and fertility ===
Chaquén was the god of fertility of the Earth and sports. He trained the Muisca to prepare them for wars and the guecha warriors and farmers honoured him to win battles and acquire good harvests. Sexual rituals where the people dressed up in coloured feathered costumes were guarded by Chaquén. He was also the creator of the Colombian national sport: tejo.

=== Nencatacoa - god of arts and dance ===
Nencatacoa was the Muisca god and protector of artists, painters, builders and drunkenness. The people in the Muisca territories worshipped him in large festivities where they got drunk of chicha. Nencatacoa was represented by a fox or bear, dressed in gold. He helped the Muisca build their bohíos, carrying the heavy wooden poles for the construction.

== Sites ==
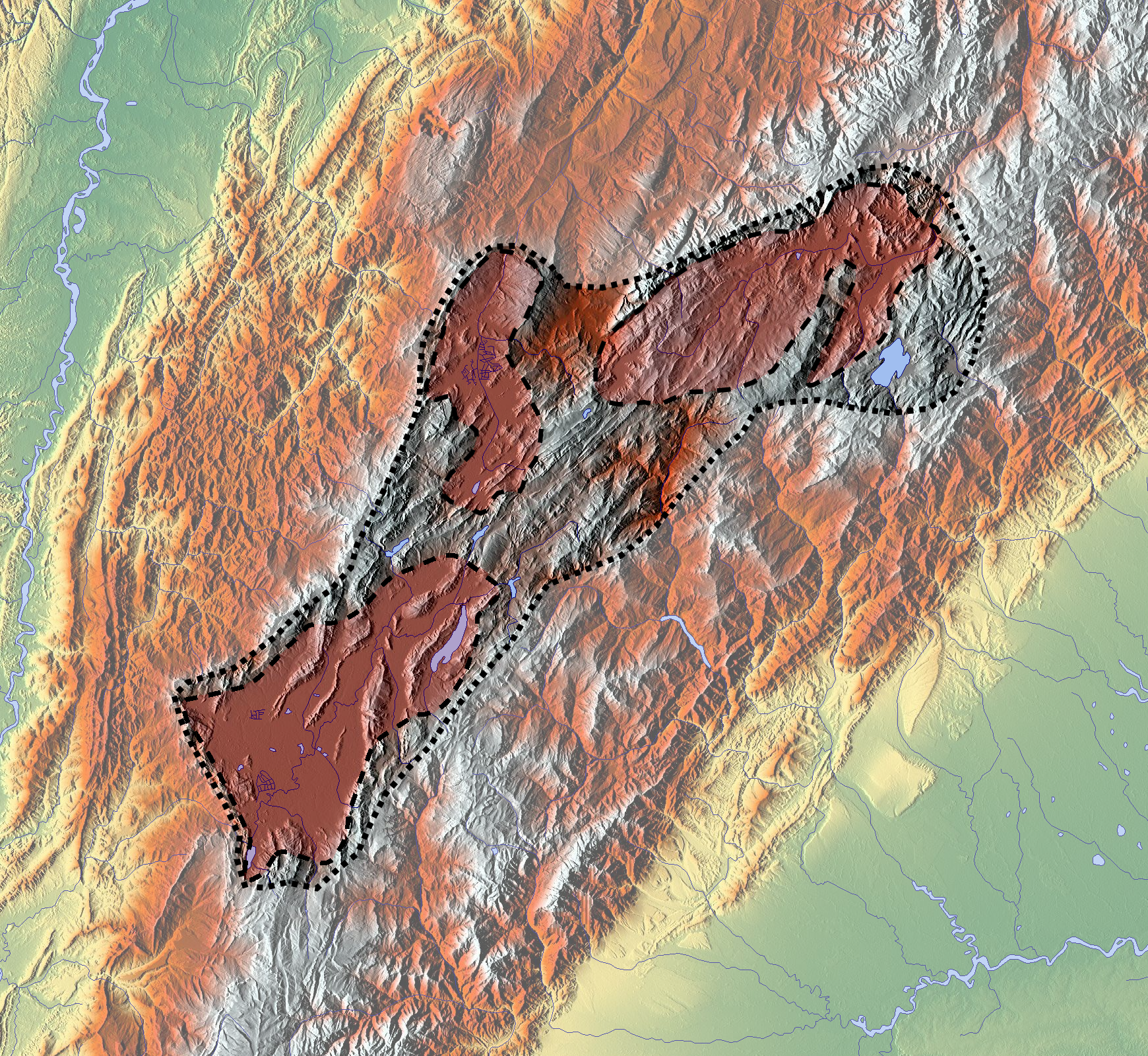
Sacred Muisca sites
G - Lake Guatavita
To - Lake Tota
Su - Lake Suesca
F - Lake Fúquene
I - Lake Iguaque
Si - Siecha Lakes
H - Lake Herrera
U - Lake Ubaque
Te - Tequendama Falls
S - Sun Temple
C - Cojines del Zaque, Goranchacha Temple
O - Solar Observatory

To honour the gods, the Muisca organised pilgrimages to their temples and other sacred sites. The pilgrimages were accompanied by music and dances as well as (sometimes human) sacrifices. The pilgrimages were led by a group of priests; ogques in their language Muysccubun, the Spanish called them jeques or xeques. The priests were trained from childhood to become the religious leaders of the Muisca. An important site for the pilgrimages of the Muisca were the Cojines del Zaque, located in the city of Hunza.

=== Temples ===
The most important temples for the Muisca were the Temple of the Sun in sacred city of the Sun Suamox (Muysccubun: "Dwelling of the Sun") and the Temple of the Moon in Chía, the town named after the Moon goddess. Here the people gathered to worship Sué and Chía. Other main temples were built in Guatavita, Bacatá and Guachetá. In the temples, images of their gods, made of gold and silver, are said to have been created. The sight of these richly decorated yet fragile temples only strengthened the legend of El Dorado that drew the Spanish conquerors inland from Santa Marta.

Both the Temple of the Moon in Chía and the Sun Temple in Sogamoso were destroyed. A reconstruction of the latter has been built in the Archaeology Museum in the City of the Sun.

=== Sacred sites ===
In the Muisca territories there were a number of natural locations considered sacred, including lakes, rivers, forests and large rocks. People gathered here to perform rituals and sacrifices mostly with gold and emeralds. Important lakes were Lake Guatavita, Lake Iguaque, Lake Fúquene, Lake Tota, the Siecha Lakes, Lake Teusacá and Lake Ubaque.

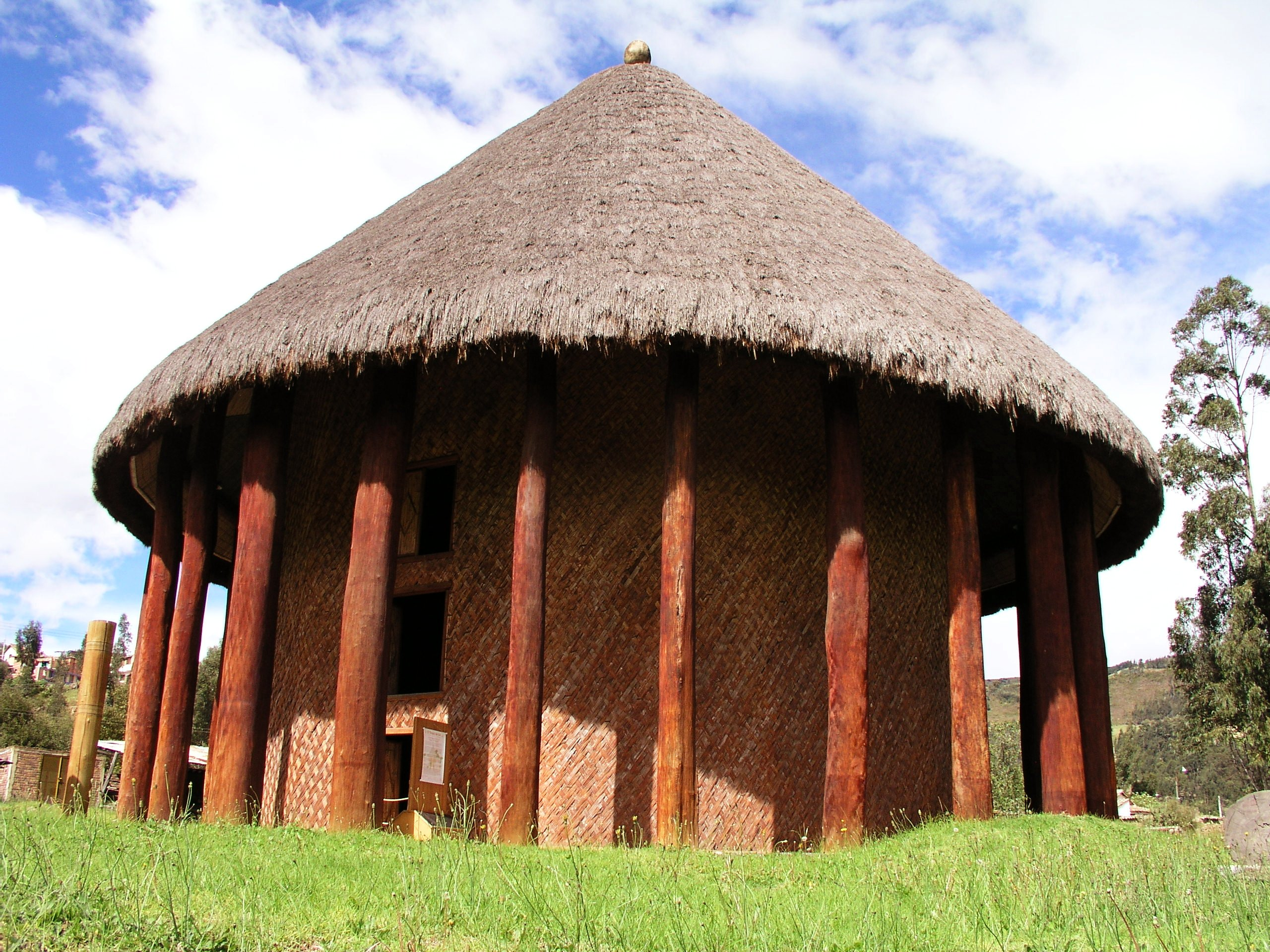
Temple of the Sun in Suamox

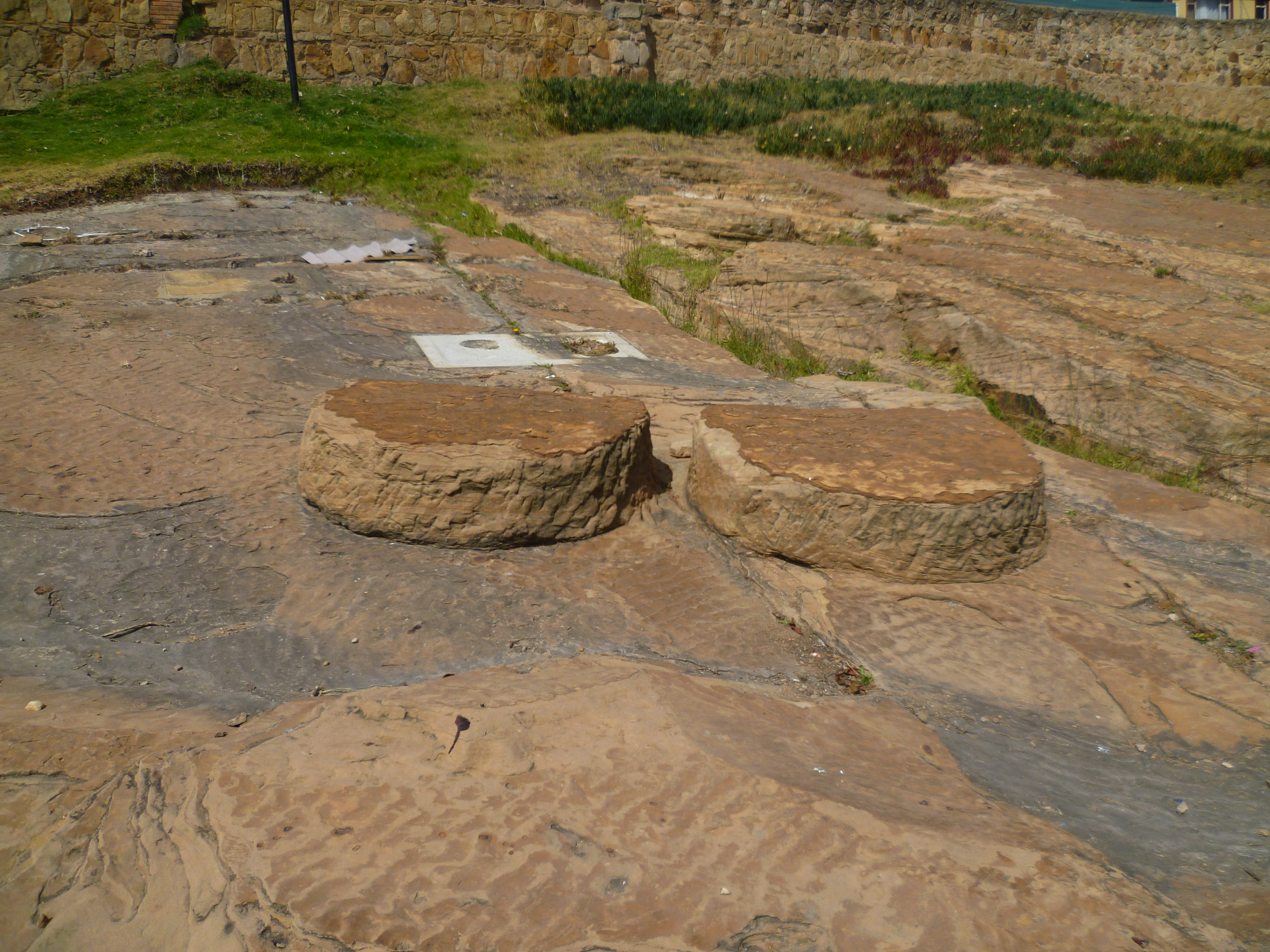
Cojines del Zaque

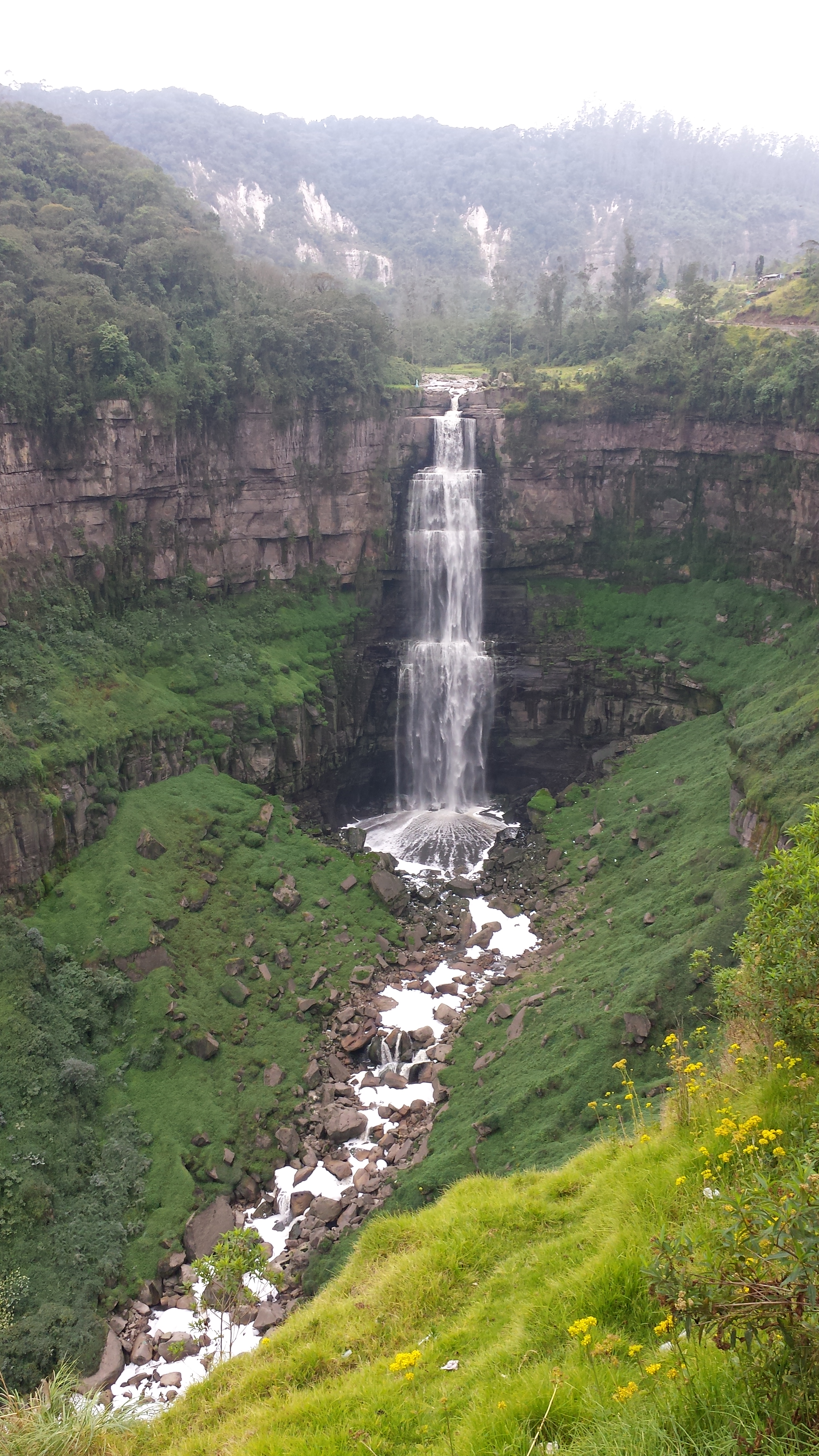
Tequendama Falls

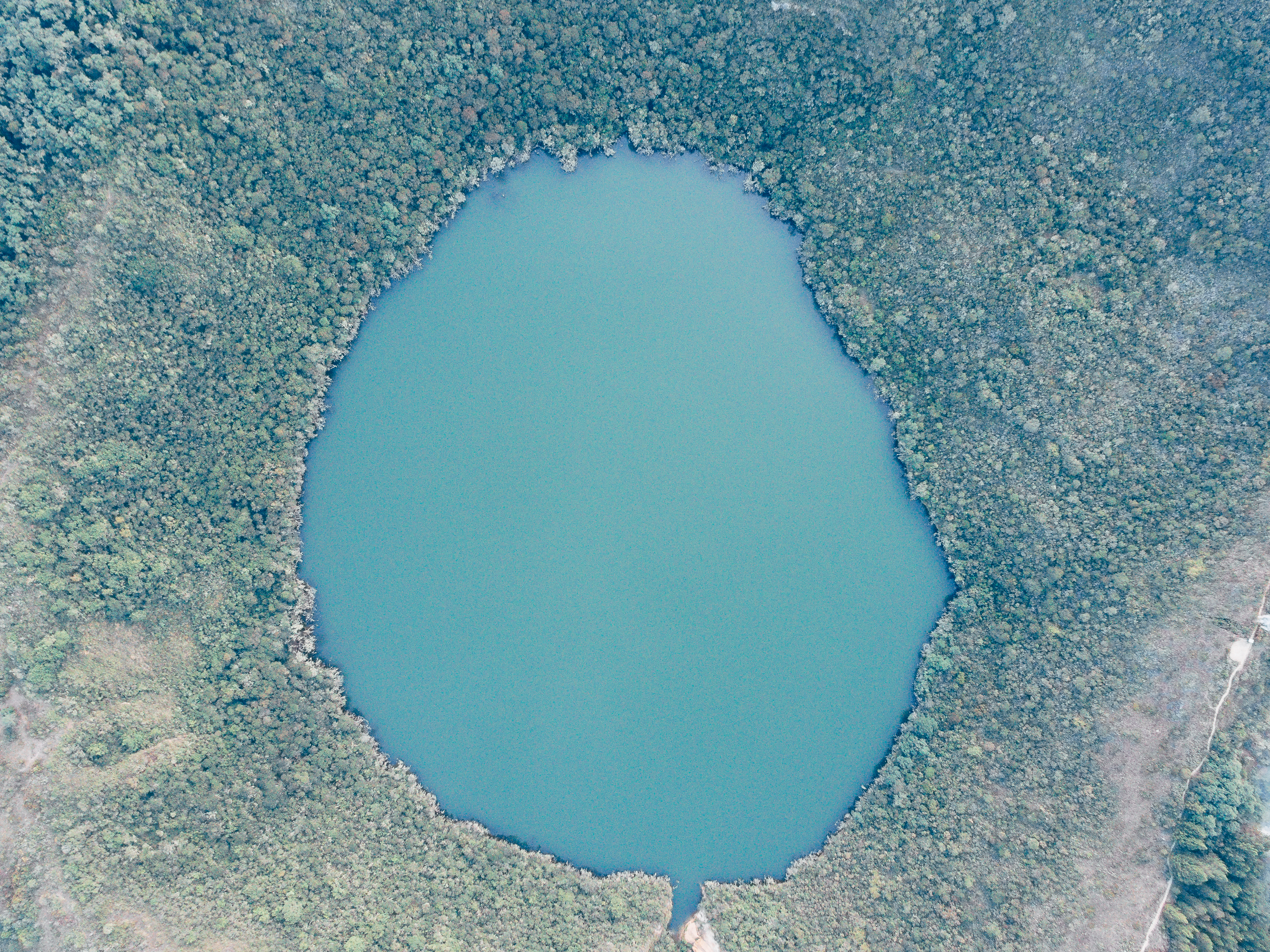
Sacred Lake Guatavita

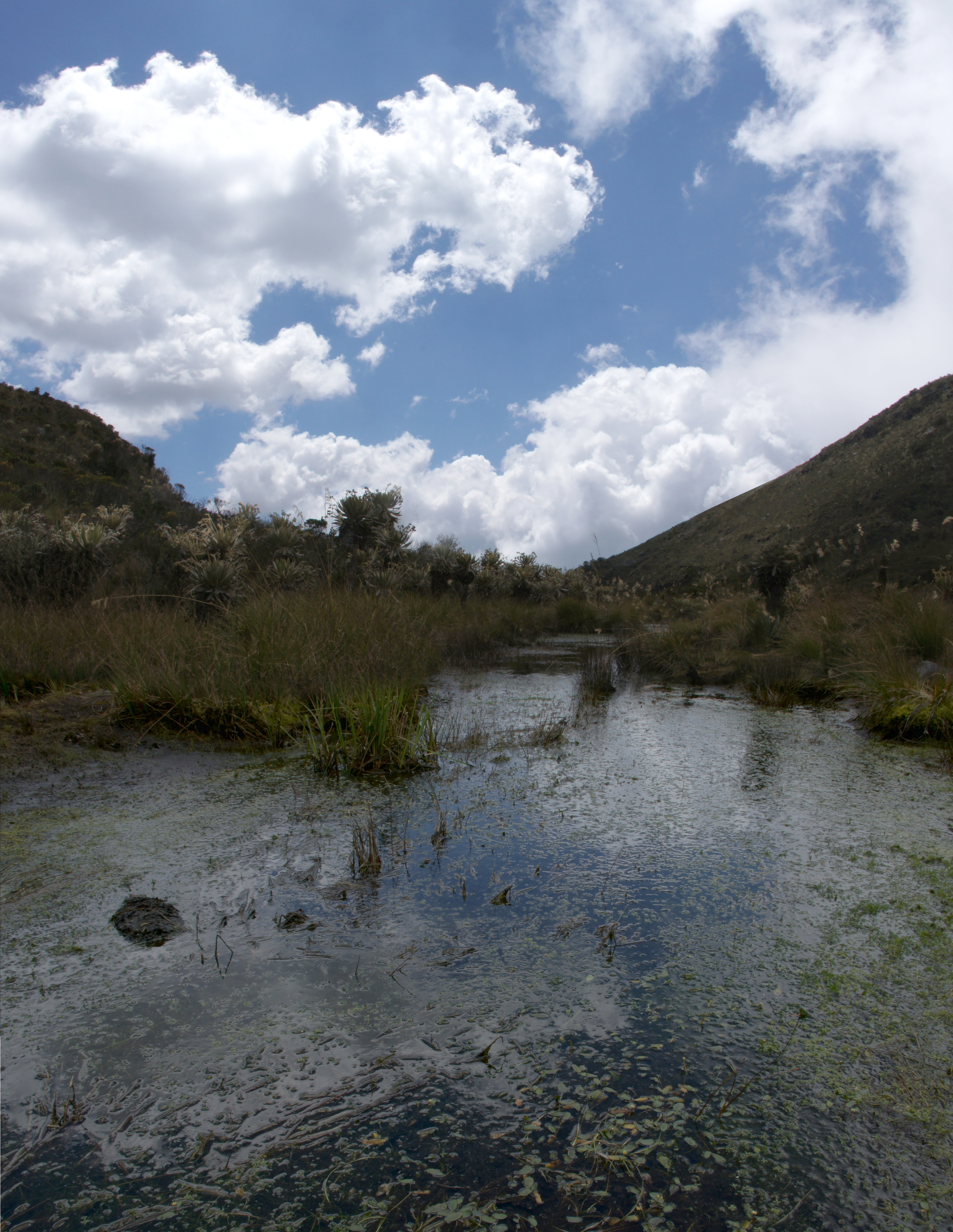
Lake Iguaque

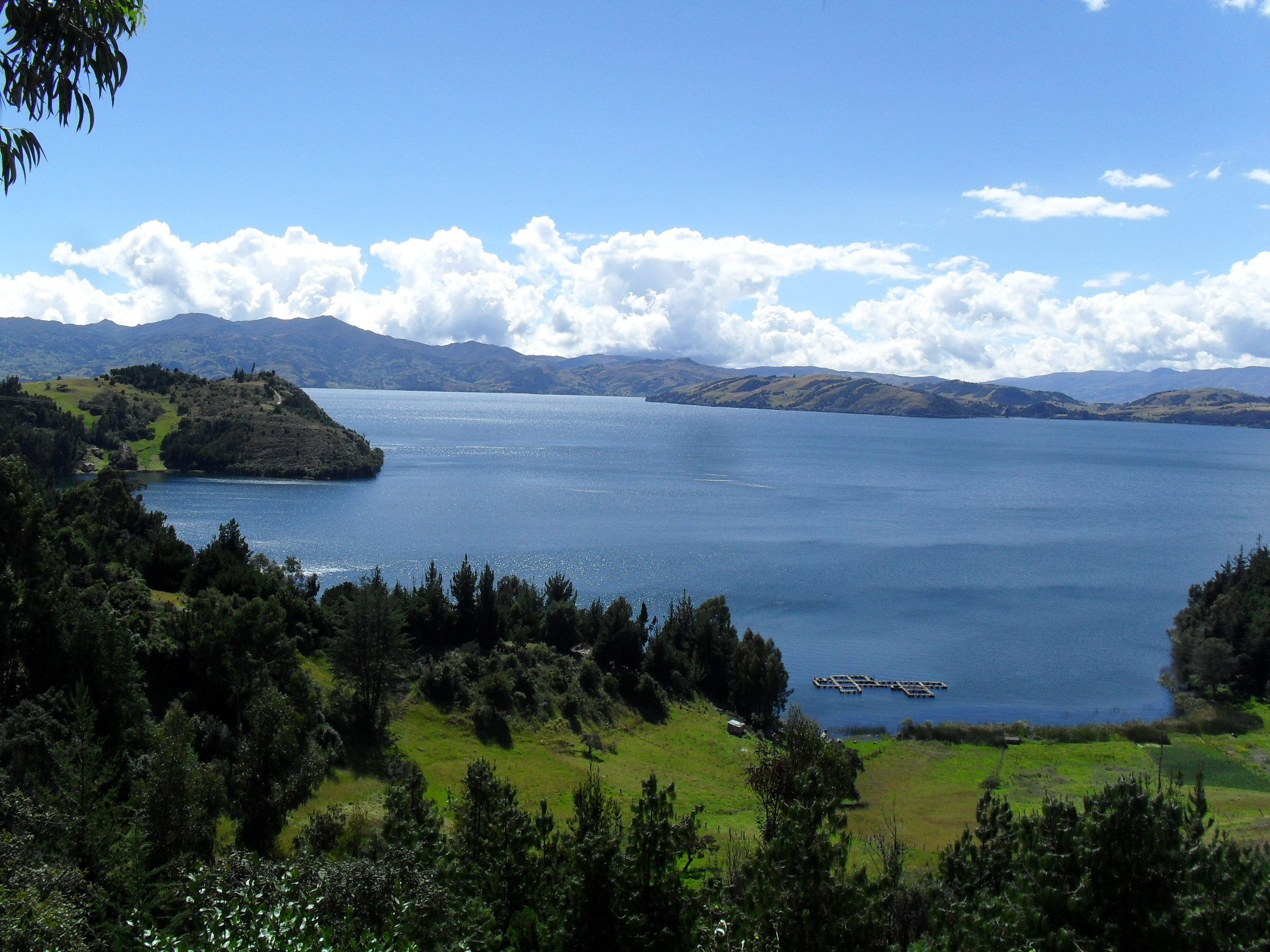
Lake Tota

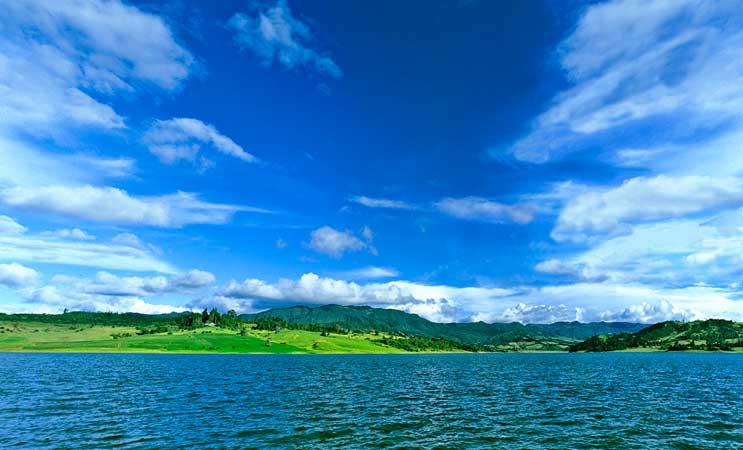
Lake Fúquene

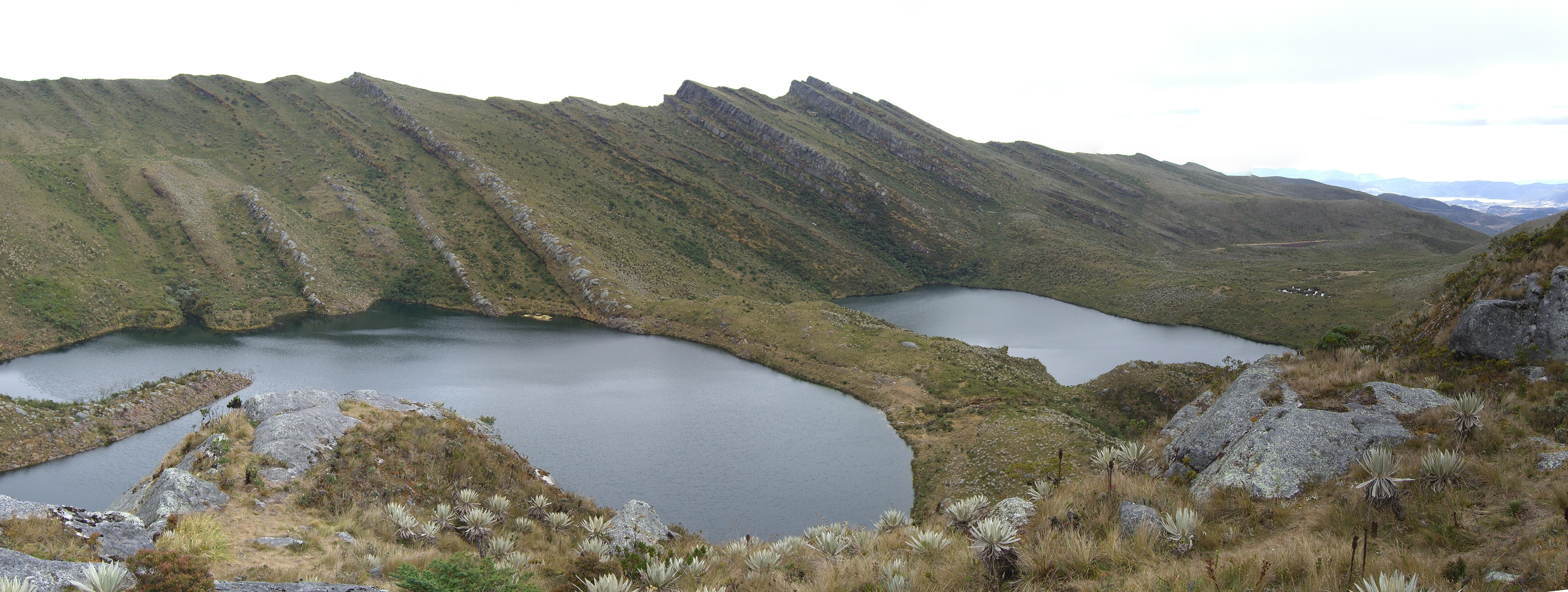
Siecha Lakes

== Sacrifices ==
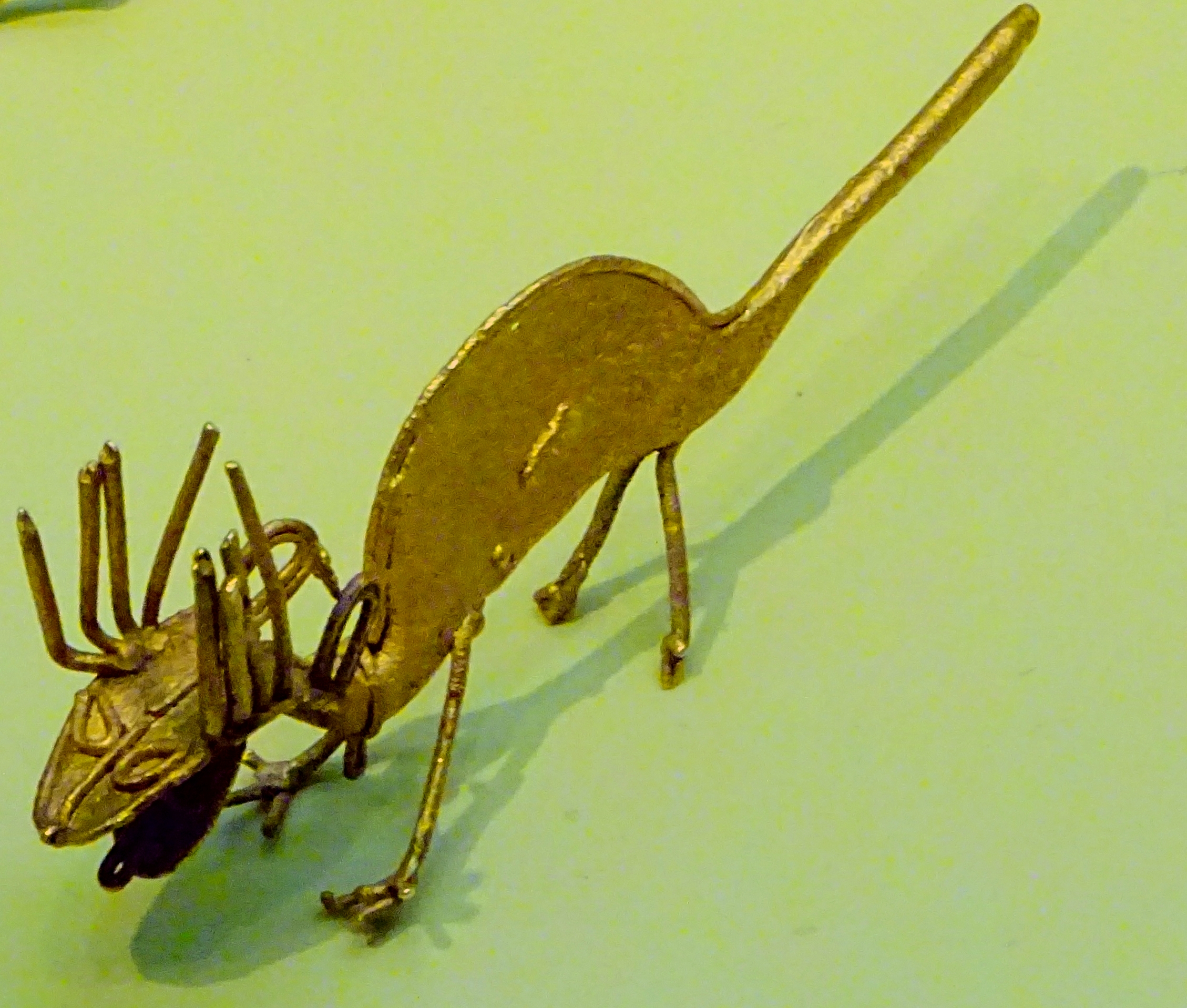
The Muisca offered tunjos

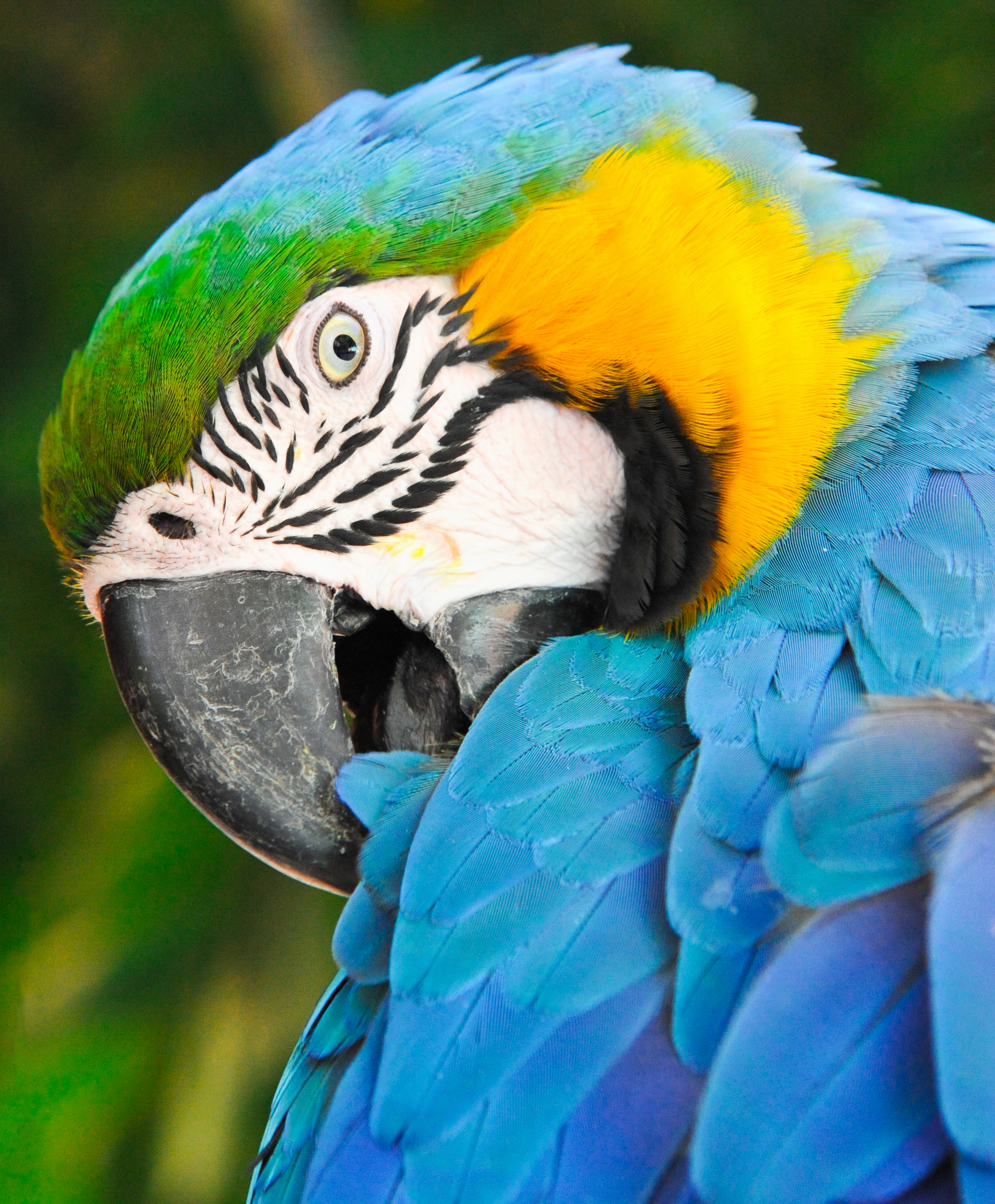
Parrots were considered to have a soul and sacrificed to the Muisca gods

The Muisca offered various precious materials to their gods; tunjos, were small anthropomorph or zoomorph offer figures made of gold or tumbaga (an alloy of gold, silver and copper). Many of the tunjos have been recovered from various sites and are displayed in the Museo del Oro. Other offer pieces were emeralds, snails, cloths and food. Also parrots and other colourful birds were used in the sacred rituals as they were considered having a soul.

=== Human sacrifices ===
Human sacrifices were not uncommon, although those were not practiced anymore when the Spanish conquistadores arrived. Only from verbal tradition we know the Muisca performed them. Jiménez de Quesada wrote that "only captured other tribes, such as the Panche and others, were used for human sacrifices in the rare occasions where humans were offered", while Lucas Fernández de Piedrahita described that "the best sacrifices to the gods were those of human blood".

All the chroniclers agree that in ancient times families offered one boy to the priests who raised them as a holy person and at fifteen years (other sources say twelve) these moxas were sacrificed. This was a great honour for the family and the victims. The sacrifices were performed by taking the heart out of the body or penetrate them with spears. At the Cojines del Zaque the moxas were sacrificed to Sué, just after sunrise.

== See also ==
- Aztec religion
- Maya religion
- Muzo religion
- Inca religion
- Muisca astronomy
- Muisca
- Tunjo
