= Nencatacoa =

Muisca god of artists

- art(ist)s, dance and festivities
- Member of Muisca religion
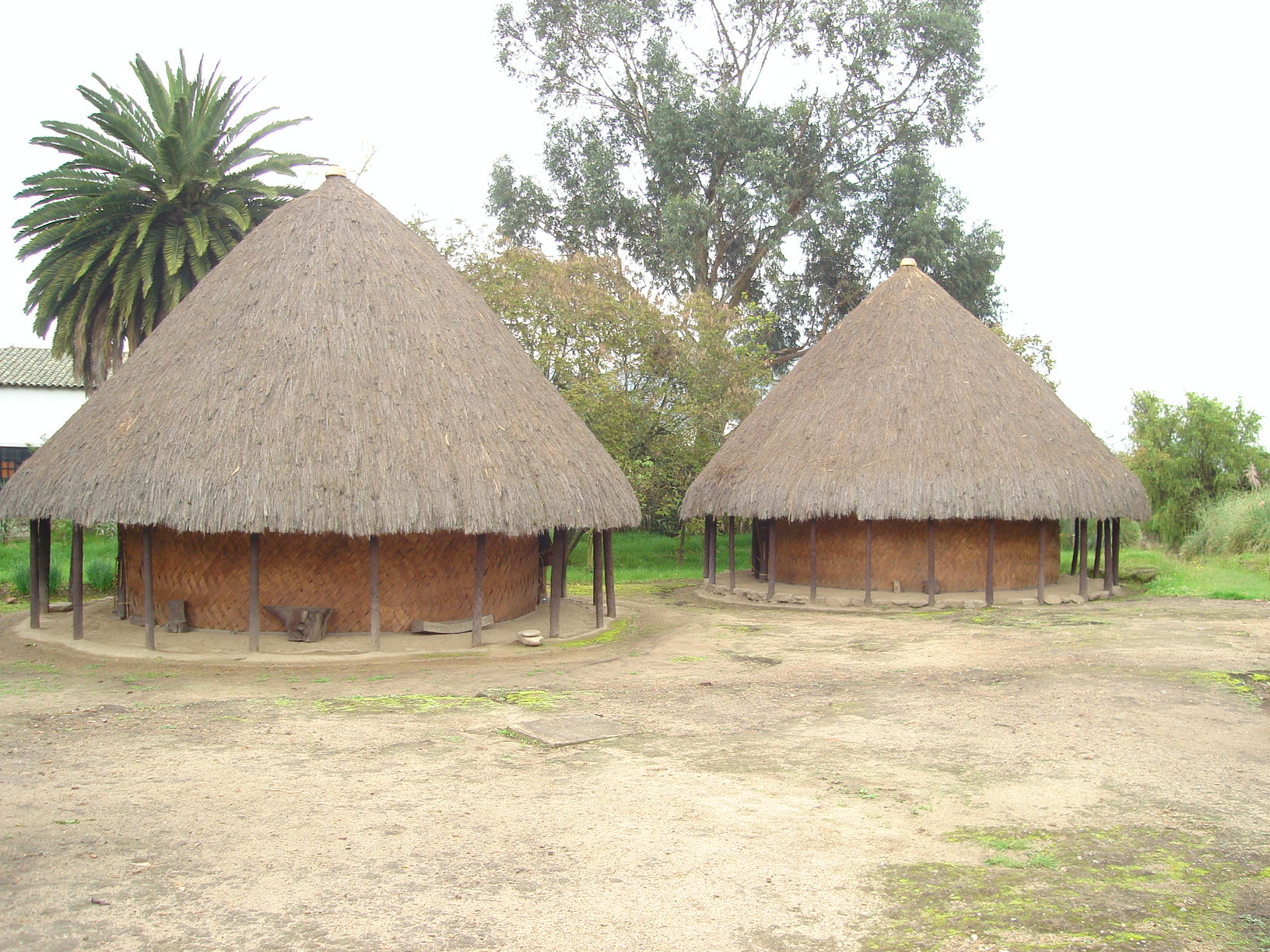
- Houses (bohíos) Nencatacoa helped being built for the Muisca, allegedly when drunk
- Other names: Nem-catacoa
- Animals: Fox or bear
- Region: Altiplano Cundiboyacense; Colombia
- Ethnic group: Muisca

Equivalents
- Christian: none
- Etruscan: Fufluns
- Greek: Pan, Dionysus, Apollo
- Roman: Bacchus

Nencatacoa or Nem-catacoa was the god and protector of the mantle makers, artists and festivities in the religion of the Muisca. The Muisca and their confederation were one of the advanced civilizations of the Americas; as much as the Aztec, Mayas and Incas but other than the other three, they did not construct grand architecture. Their gold working however was well-known and respected which made Nencatacoa an important deity and protector.

== Description ==
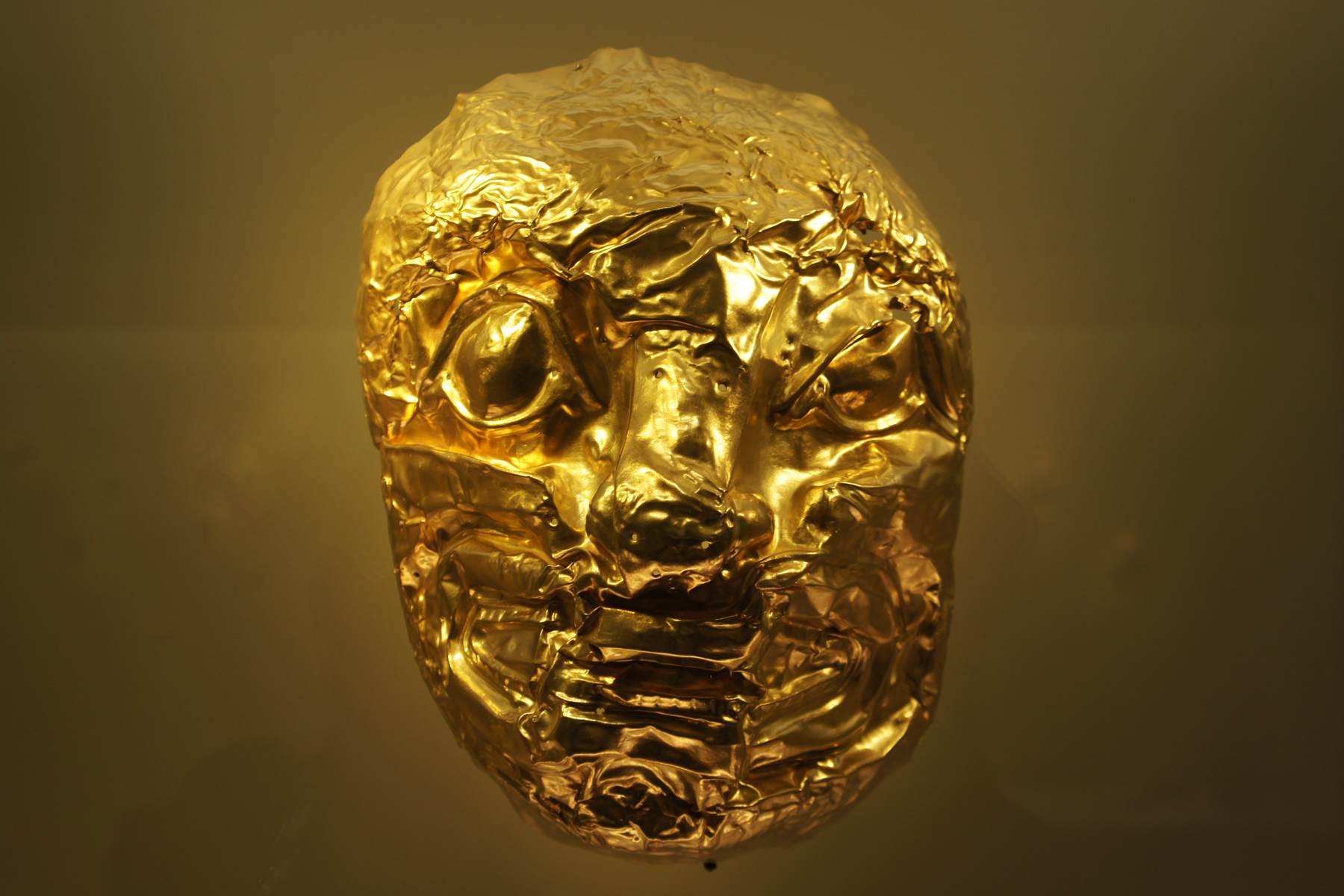
Golden mask in the Museo del Oro Ritual gold mask

Nencatacoa was represented in the form of a forest animal, made of gold and covered with a mantle. Nencatacoa looked most like a fox or a bear, dressed in gold, because as Pedro Simón noted, "an animal in that shape would appear multiple times".

He was the protector god of the weavers, an industry that was very important among the Muisca, who used a great variety of materials but mostly cotton and fique.

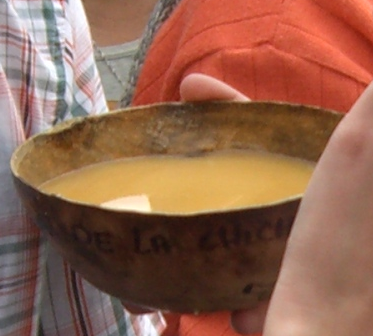
Chicha; alcoholic drink from fermented maize, main ingredient of the festivities around Nencatacoa

Nencatacoa was also the protector of artists and painters who realized their beautiful creations on the cloths, the ceramics, gold metallurgy, sculptures and petroglyphs with different anthropomorphic, zoomorphic and ideogramatic figures.

Moreover, Nencatacoa was the god of festivities, drunkenness and dance. Traditions tell us that he partied with the people without caring about anything else. The Muisca drank chicha, a type of alcoholic drink based on the fermentation and cooking of maize. When the indigenous peoples were constructing their houses he helped them with lifting the heavy poles. Even during the construction of their houses (bohíos) and temples, the Muisca drank much chicha.

Also to celebrate the completion of temples, houses or roads and with the arrival of new caciques the Muisca drank much chicha. At times of sowing and harvest, they celebrated with dancing, singing, music (with drums and flutes) and honoured the gods, in particular Nencatacoa.

Nencatacoa thus appeared to be similar in style and association to the Greek god Dionysus and the Roman Bacchus. Chronicler Pedro Simón described about the Muisca that when they were partying and dancing around the fire and the wind blew that was a sign that Nencatacoa was participating.
