= List of Muisca museum collections =

This is a list of museum collections pertaining to the Muisca. Most of the Muisca artefacts are housed in the Gold Museum, Bogotá, the museum with the most golden objects in the world. Other findings are in the Archaeology Museum in Sogamoso and in the Archaeology Museum of Pasca. Few artefacts are on display outside Colombia. Most of the objects outside Colombia are tunjos; small offer pieces part of the Muisca religion.

== Muisca museum collections ==
Museum	City	Country	Number of objects	Type of objects	Notes
Gold Museum	Bogotá	Colombia	1000s	a.o. Muisca raft	
Archaeology Museum	Sogamoso, Boyacá	Colombia	3000	a.o. replica of Sun Temple	
Archaeology Museum	Pasca, Cundinamarca	Colombia	a.o. replica of Muisca raft, mummies		
Metropolitan Museum of Art	New York City	United States	22	tunjos, pendants, mask, mold, handle, diadem	
Museum of Fine Arts	Houston, Texas	United States	21	tunjos, pendants, noserings, earrings, beads	
Cleveland Museum of Art	Cleveland, Ohio	United States	13	9 tunjos, 2 beads, 2 pendants	
Art Institute of Chicago	Chicago, Illinois	United States	4	tunjos	
Baltimore Museum of Art	Baltimore, Maryland	United States	2	tunjos	
Brooklyn Museum	New York City	United States	2	tunjo & yopo tray	
Dallas Museum of Art	Dallas, Texas	United States	2	tunjos	
National Museum of the American Indian	Washington D.C.	United States	2	tunjo & ceramic head	
Yale University Art Gallery	New Haven, Connecticut	United States	1	pendant	
Princeton University Art Museum	Princeton, New Jersey	United States	1	tunjo	
Denver Art Museum	Denver, Colorado	United States	1	ceramic jar	
American Museum of Natural History	New York City	United States	1	tunjo	
Hunt Museum	Limerick	Ireland	1	tunjo	
The Israel Museum	Jerusalem	Israel	1	pectoral	
British Museum	London	United Kingdom	2	tunjo & mummy	

== See also ==
- List of Muisca research institutes
- List of Muisca scholars
- Muisca
