= Goranchacha Temple =

Archaeological site in Colombia

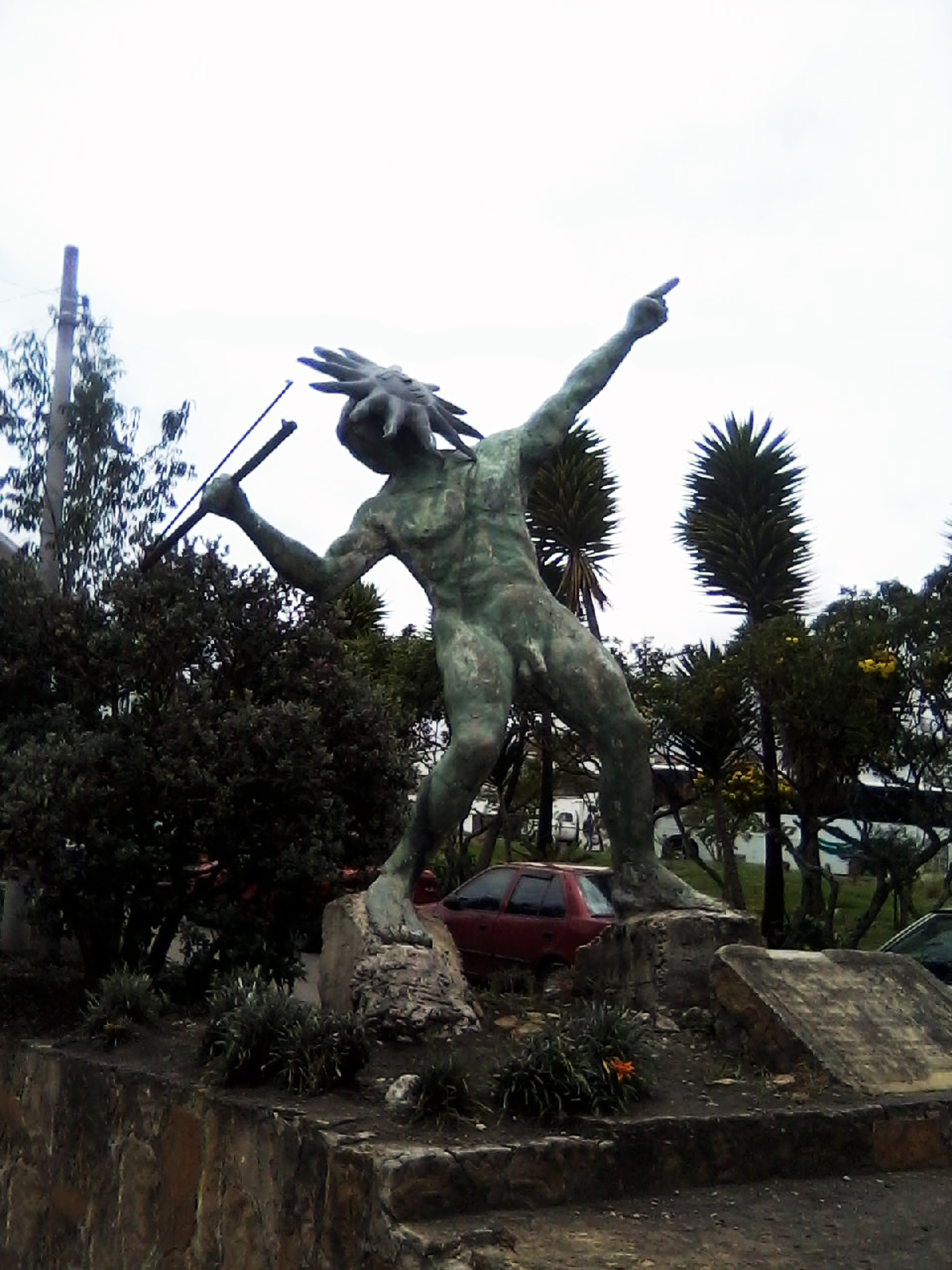
- Statue representing Goranchacha, who ordered the construction of the temple

- Location within Colombia
- 5°33′8.84″N 73°21′27.76″W
- Type: Religious site
- Periods: (Pre-)Muisca
- Cultures: Muisca
- Satellite of: Hunza
- Location: Tunja, Boyacá
- Region: Altiplano Cundiboyacense, Colombia
- Part of: Universidad Pedagógica y Tecnológica de Colombia; Muisca sites

History
- Abandoned: Spanish conquest

Site notes
- Elevation: 2,693 m (8,835 ft)
- Archaeologists: Gregorio Hernández de Alba
- Condition: Parts excavated
- Public access: Yes

The Goranchacha Temple (Spanish: Templo de Goranchacha) is an archeological site of the Muisca located in the city of Tunja, Boyacá, which in the time of the Muisca Confederation was called Hunza. The temple is named after the mythological Goranchacha. The remains of the temple are located on the terrain of the Pedagogical and Technological University of Colombia in Tunja. Scholar Javier Ocampo López has written about the temple and its religious meaning. Knowledge about the temple has been provided by chronicler Pedro Simón.

== Background ==
During the time before the Spanish conquest of the Muisca, the central highlands of the Colombian Andes (Altiplano Cundiboyacense) were populated by the Muisca. This advanced civilization had its own religion and rituals, centered around the most important deities Sué and Chía. The northern territories were ruled by the iraca of Sugamuxi, the tundama of Tundama and the zaque based in Hunza.

Goranchacha was a mythical cacique who moved the capital of the northern Muisca from Ramiriquí to Hunza and was feared by the people, ruling as a dictator.

== Description ==
The Goranchacha Temple was allegedly constructed of two circular structures of rocks, reed and wood, transported from the farthest regions of the Muisca Confederation. In the centre was placed a column to support the roof. Goranchacha ordered the temple to be built to worship his father; Sué, the God of the Sun. The cacique organised pilgrimages to the temple passing over painted cotton mantles and adorned with flower petals. At the temple offerings were made.

Pedro Simón wrote about the temple:

"Cerca de las postreras casas del pueblo a la parte del norte donde ahora llaman las cuadras de Porras, hizo edificar un templo a su padre el Sol donde lo hacía venerar con frecuentes sacrificios..."

"Close to the farthest houses of the village in the northern part where today it's called Porras quarter, he ordered the construction of a temple to his father, the Sun, where he venerated him with frequent sacrifices..."

The location of the temple was found using this description in 1937 by Colombian archaeologist Gregorio Hernández de Alba (1904–1973). He excavated the site.

Today, the remains of the temple are part of the Universidad Pedagógica y Tecnológica de Colombia in Tunja.

== See also ==
- Muisca religion, mythology
- Cojines del Zaque, Sun Temple, Moon Temple, Hunzahúa Well
