= Muisca astronomy =

Astronomy of the Muisca civilization

This article describes the astronomy of the Muisca. The Muisca, one of the four advanced civilisations in the Americas before the Spanish conquest of the Muisca, had a thorough understanding of astronomy, as evidenced by their architecture and calendar, important in their agriculture.

Various astronomical sites have been constructed on the Altiplano Cundiboyacense, the territories of the Muisca in the central Colombian Andes, but few remain today. Many archaeoastronomical places have been destroyed by the Spanish conquistadores and replaced by their catholic churches. El Infiernito, outside Villa de Leyva, is the best known of the remaining sites. The Temple of the Sun in sacred City of the Sun Sugamuxi has been reconstructed.

Important scholars who have contributed to the knowledge of the Muisca astronomy were José Domingo Duquesne and Alexander von Humboldt in the late 18th and early 19th century and modern researchers as Eliécer Silva Celis, Manuel Arturo Izquierdo Peña, Carl Henrik Langebaek and Juan David Morales.

== Background ==
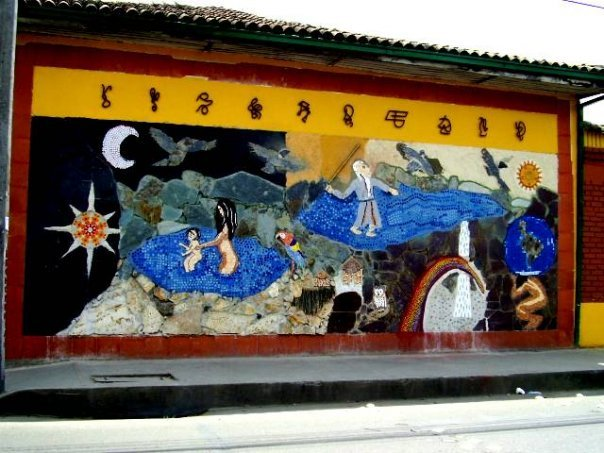
Mural showing various gods based on the astronomy of the Muisca, most notably the Sun; Sué, Moon; Chía and bearded messenger Bochica

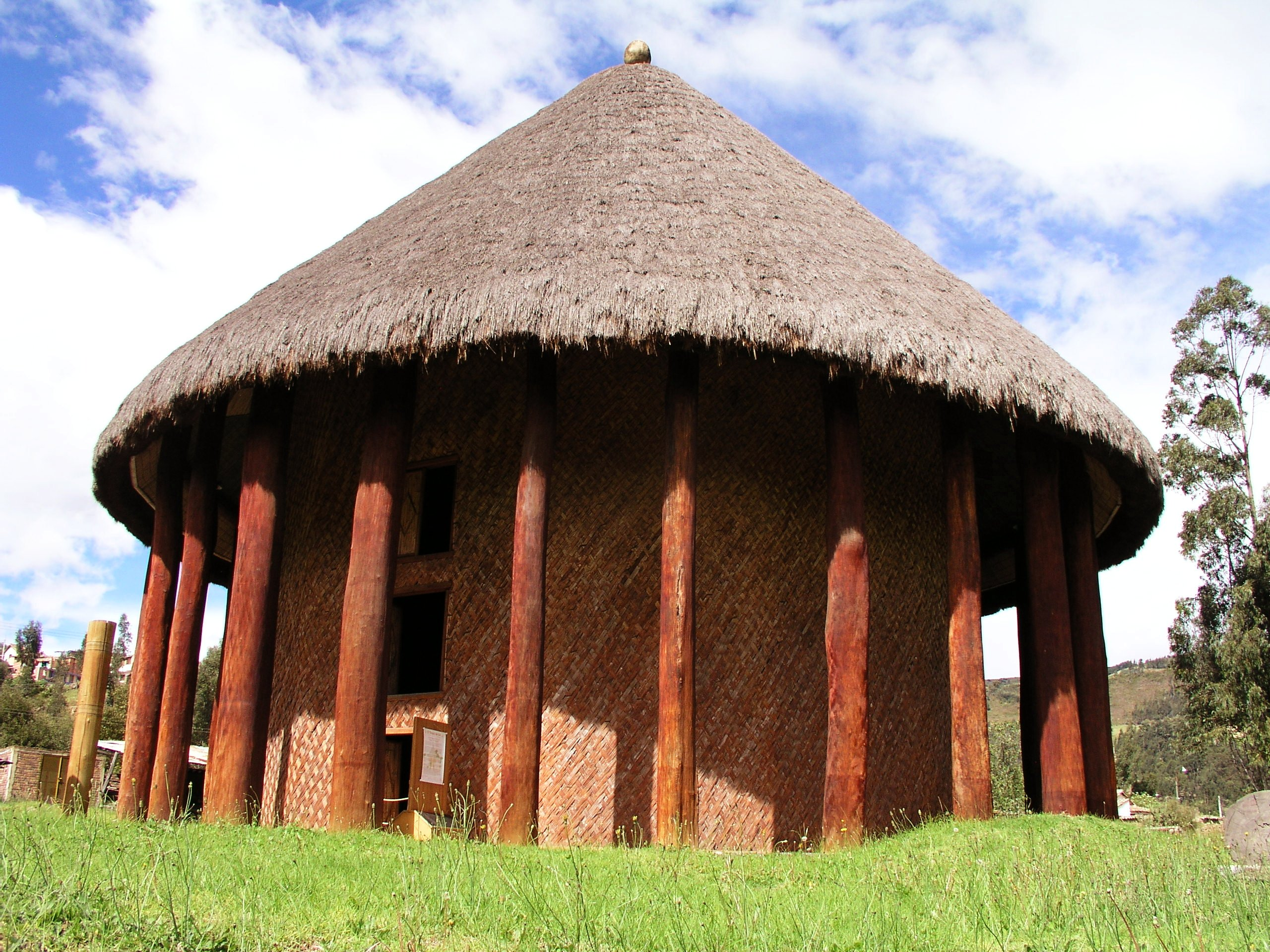
Reconstruction of the Sun Temple of Suamox

The Muisca were an advanced civilisation, who inhabited the Altiplano Cundiboyacense and as southeastern part of that the Bogotá savanna before the Spanish conquest of the Muisca, of what became known as Colombia today. The onset of the Muisca Period is commonly set at 800 AD, following the Herrera Period, and the reign of the Muisca lasted until the arrival of the Spanish in 1537.

On the fertile plains of the Andean high plateau the Muisca developed a rich economy consisting of agricultural technologies of drainage and irrigation, fine crafts of gold, tumbaga and ceramics and textiles and a religious and mythological society. The political organisation was rather loose; a set of different rulers who traded with each other in small communities. Trading and pilgrimage routes (calzadas) were built across the plains and through the hills of the Altiplano.

== Muisca astronomy ==
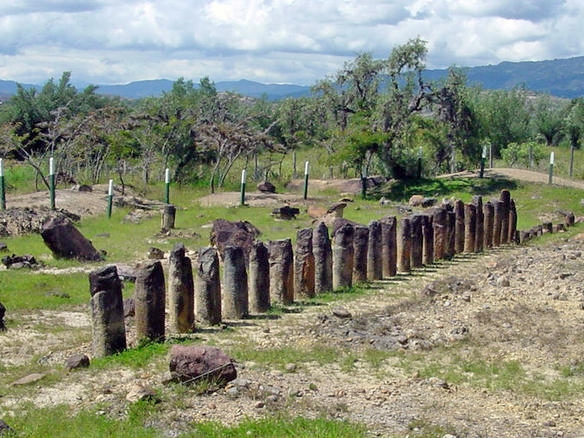
El Infiernito is one of the few surviving sites of the Muisca astronomy

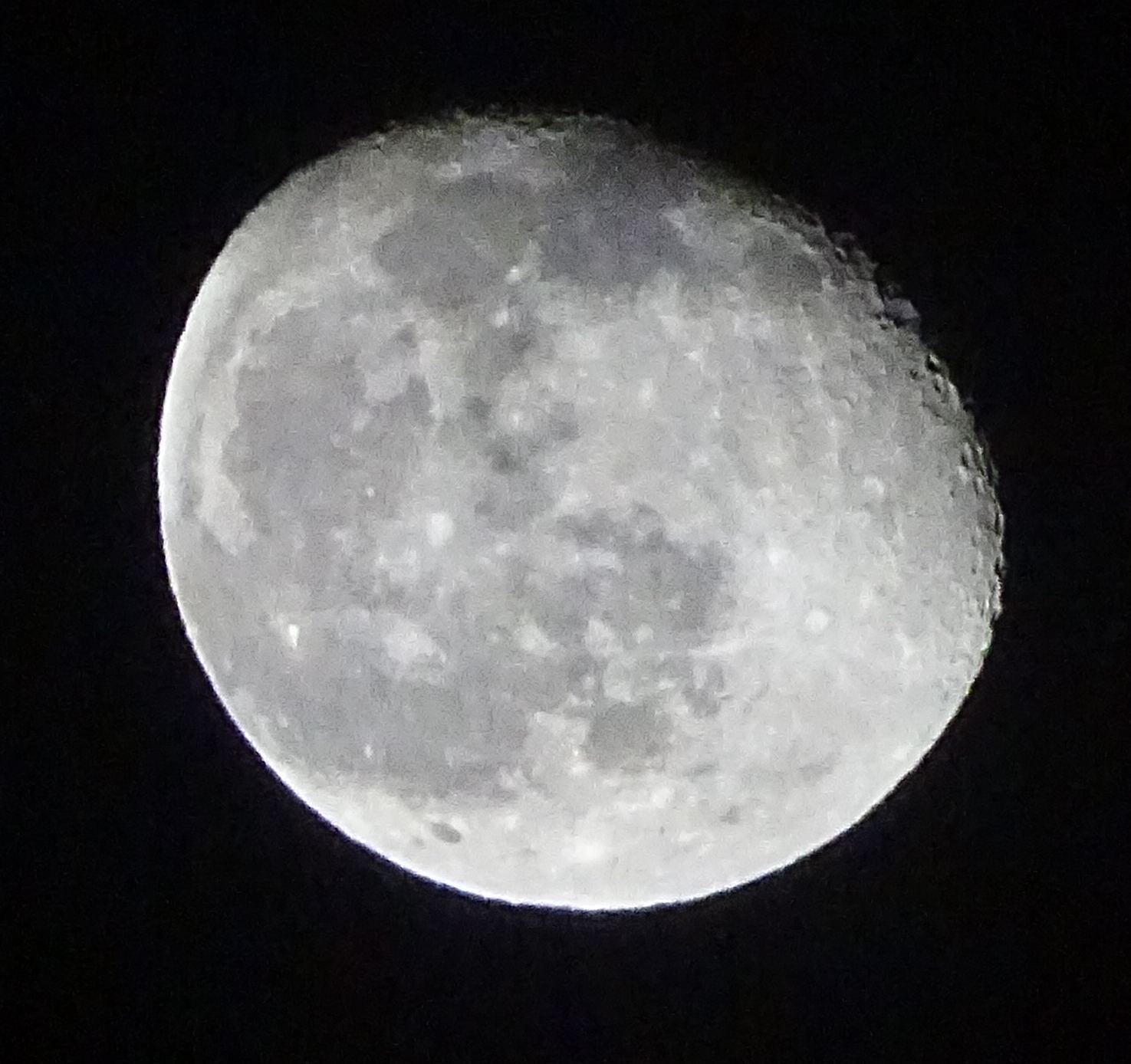
Chía, goddess of the Moon, rising over the Bogotá savanna

The most important and still remaining archaeological site of the Muisca, dates to the pre-Muisca Herrera Period; called by the Spanish conquerors El Infiernito. It is an astronomical site where at solstices the Sun lines up the shadows of the stone pillars exactly with the sacred Lake Iguaque, where according to the Muisca religion the mother goddess Bachué was born. Additionally, the site used to be a place of pilgrimage where the Muisca gathered and interchanged goods. Archaeologist Carl Henrik Langebaek noted that the festivities performed at El Infiernito date back to the Early Muisca Period (800-1200 AD) and that no evidence was found those celebrations existed in the Herrera Period. The true alignments of the pillar shadows are 91 (east) and 271 degrees (west). The eastern alignment points to the Morro Negro hill. El Infiernito at the equinoxes also announced the rainy seasons on the Altiplano.

Astronomy was an important factor in the organisation of the Muisca, both in terms of cycles of harvest and sowing and in the construction of their architecture. The temples and houses were built with an east–west orientation; aligning with the rise and set of the Sun, Moon and Venus. Also in the textiles of the people, the symbols for the Sun and Moon are visible. It is probable that the deities in the religion of the Muisca represented weavers of the Earth and the terrain.

The Muisca used gold for their art and rituals and the gold was considered "Semen of the Sun". At the ritual of the installation of the new zipa in Lake Guatavita, depicted in the famous Muisca raft, the new zipa would cover his naked body with gold dust and jump in the lake. Music was played and he was surrounded by four priests, representing two children of the Sun and two children of the Moon.

=== Relation with religion and geography ===
The religion of the Muisca contained various deities who were based on cosmological and environmental factors (Cuchavira; rainbow, Chibchacum; rain, Nencatacoa; fertility). The supreme being of the Muisca, Chiminigagua represented the birth of the Universe who had sent two birds to create light and shape the Earth. His children were the god of the Sun; Sué and his wife, the goddess of the Moon; Chía. Both deities served as the basis for the complex lunisolar Muisca calendar, having different divisions for synodic and sidereal months. The days were equal to the Gregorian calendar days and the three different years were composed of sets of different months; rural years of 12 or 13 months, common years of 20 months and holy years of 37 months.

One of the most important religious figures in the Muisca religion was Bochica, the bearded messenger god. According to the myths, Bochica walked from Pasca to Iza. The line connecting those two places in the southeastern part of the Altiplano with the northwestern part has an azimuth of exactly 45 degrees.

Also the line between the city of Bacatá with the constructed Temple of the Sun in Sugamuxi has an azimuth of 45 degrees. The length between the two places is 110 kilometres (68 mi) which equals to one degree of the circumference of the Earth. Continuing this trajectory to the northeast, it lines up with the highest peak of the Sierra Nevada del Cocuy.

=== Muisca astronomical sites ===
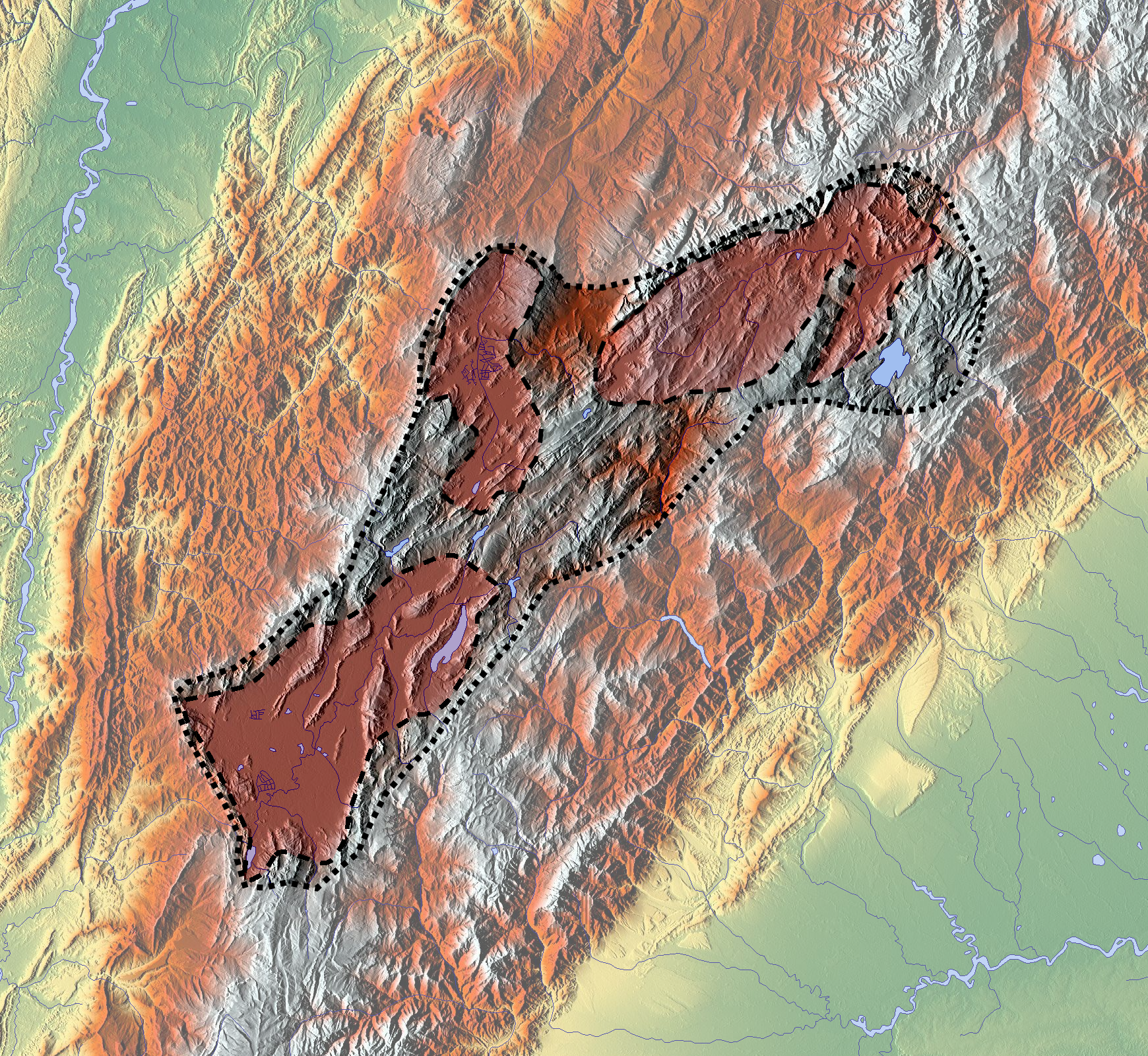
Important Muisca astronomical sites on the Altiplano
O - Solar Observatory
C - Cojines del Zaque
S - Sun Temple
M - Moon Temple
B - Bolívar Square
White sites destroyed
yellow sites existing

Throughout the territories of the Muisca Confederation there have existed numerous temples and other sites of the Muisca. Today very few of those remain. A reconstruction of the Sun Temple of Sugamuxi has been built in the Archaeology Museum, Sogamoso, the Moon Temple of Chía has been destroyed, El Infiernito exists still from pre-Muisca times and the Cojines del Zaque are two stones located in Tunja. The Cojines were built aligned to former temples of the Muisca, like the Goranchacha Temple. On the sites of the temples, the Spanish colonisers built their churches. The Cojines are aligned with an azimuth of 106 degrees to the cross quarter of the Sun, passing over the present-day San Francisco church to the sacred hill of Romiquira.

Seen from Bolívar Square in Bogotá, the Sun at the June solstice rises exactly over Monserrate, called by the Muisca quijicha caca or "grandmother's foot", and at the December solstice Sué appears from behind Guadalupe Hill or quijicha guexica ("grandfather's foot"). At the equinoxes of March and September, the Sun rises in the valley right between the two hills.

Animation of Muisca astronomy; Sué at the solstices and equinoxes rising above the Eastern Hills, as seen from Bolívar Square

== Luni-solar calendar ==
Greg. year 12 months	Month 30 days	Rural year 12/13 mths	Common year 20 months	Holy year 37 months	Symbols; "meanings" - activities
1	1	Ata	Ata	Ata	Jumping toad; "start of the year"
1	2	Ata	Ata	Bosa	Nose and nostrils
1	3	Ata	Ata	Mica	Open eyes and nose; "to look for", "to find"
1	4	Ata	Ata	Muyhica	Two closed eyes; "black thing", "to grow"
1	5	Ata	Ata	Hisca	Two fingers together; "green thing", "to enjoy"
1	6	Ata	Ata	Ta	Stick and cord; "sowing" - harvest
1	7	Ata	Ata	Cuhupqua	Two ears covered; "deaf person"
1	8	Ata	Ata	Suhuza	Tail; "to spread"
1	9	Ata	Ata	Aca	Toad with tail connected to other toad; "the goods"
1	10	Ata	Ata	Ubchihica	Ear; "shining Moon", "to paint"
1	11	Ata	Ata	Ata	
1	12	Ata	Ata	Bosa	

Chía and Sué formed the basis of the complex Muisca calendar, where synodic and sidereal months were taken into account in three types of years; rural years of 12 or 13 months, common years of 20 months and holy years of 37 months. Weeks with weekly markets were 4 days, making every month 7 weeks.

According to Duquesne, the Muisca used their 'perfect' number gueta; a century consisted of 20 holy years (20 times 37 months; 740) which equals almost 60 Gregorian years. The same scholar referred to a "common century" (siglo vulgar) comprising 20 times 20 months. Pedro Simón, as described by Izquierdo Peña, found two different centuries; in the northern part of the Muisca Confederation (capital Hunza) and in the south, capital Bacatá. It is hypothesized by Izquierdo Peña that this apparent difference was due to a typo in the chronicles of Simón. Combining the different analyses by the scholars over time, Izquierdo Peña found the arrival of Bochica, described by Pedro Simón to have occurred 14800 months and the dream of Bochica to supposedly have happened 20 Bxogonoa or 2000 holy years (consisting of 37 months) before the time of description. In the Gregorian calendar this equates to 6166.7 years.

== See also ==
- Archaeoastronomy
- Muisca calendar
- Maya astronomy
