= List of Muisca research institutes =

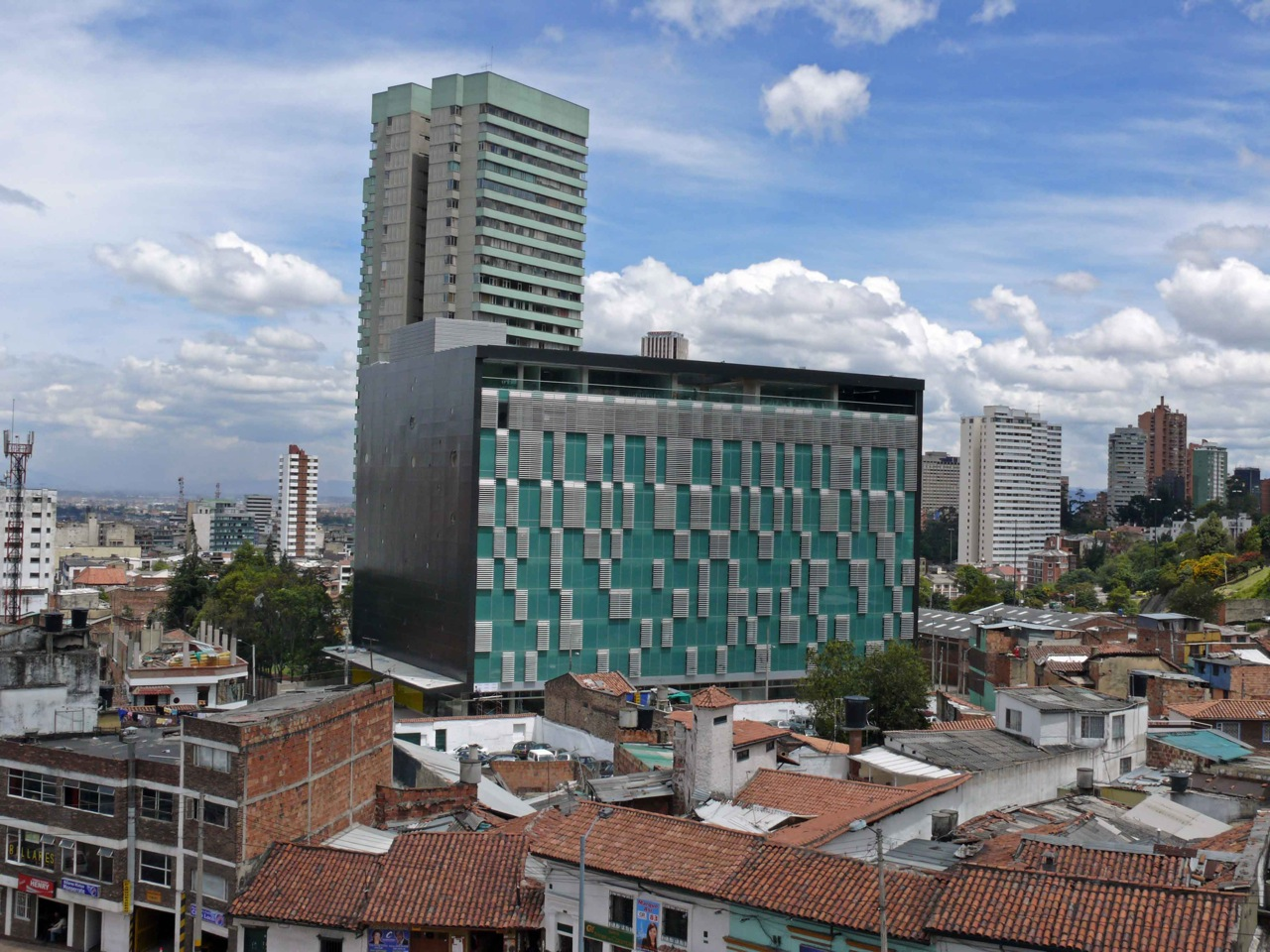
Universidad de Los Andes

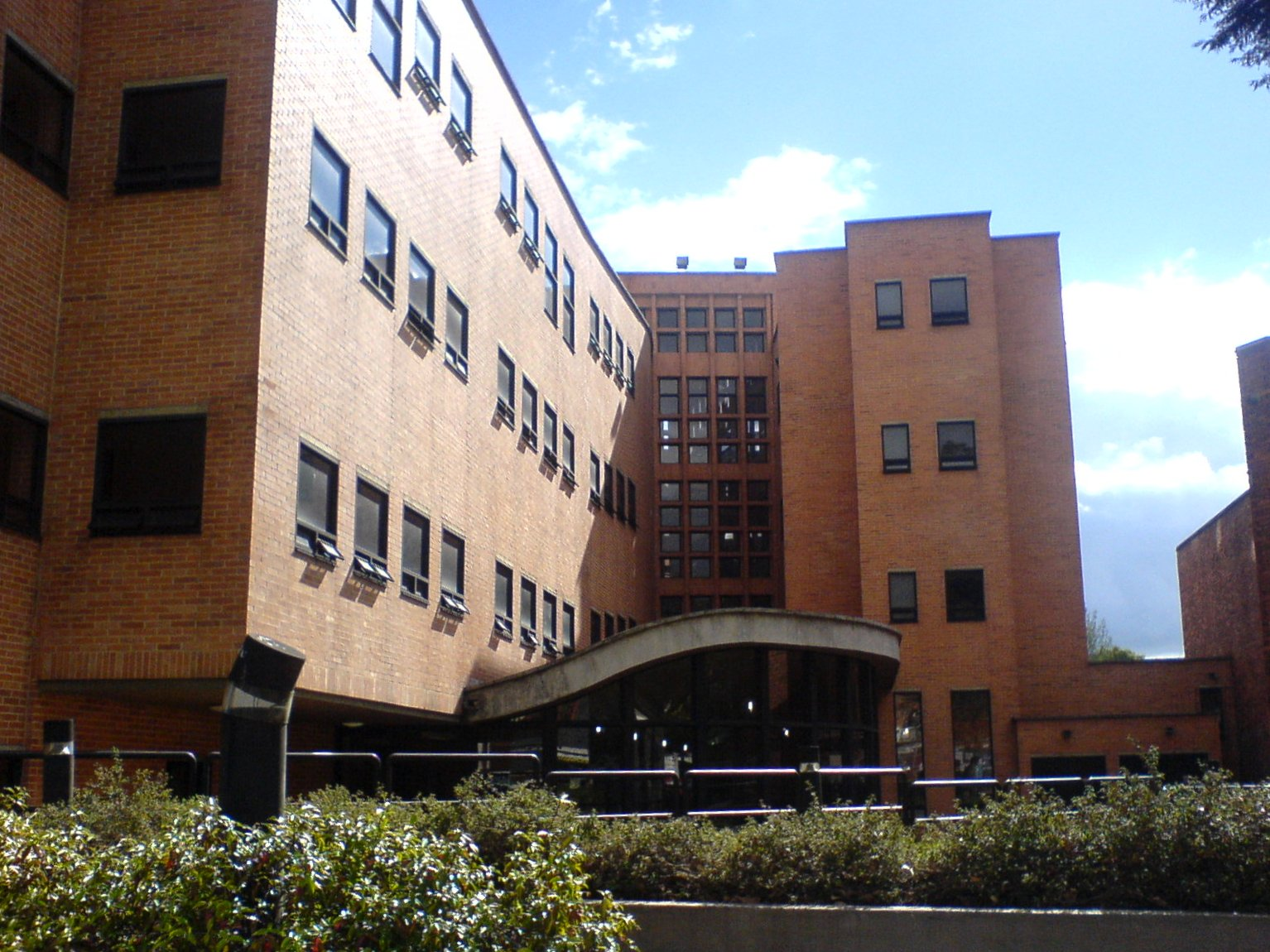
Universidad Nacional

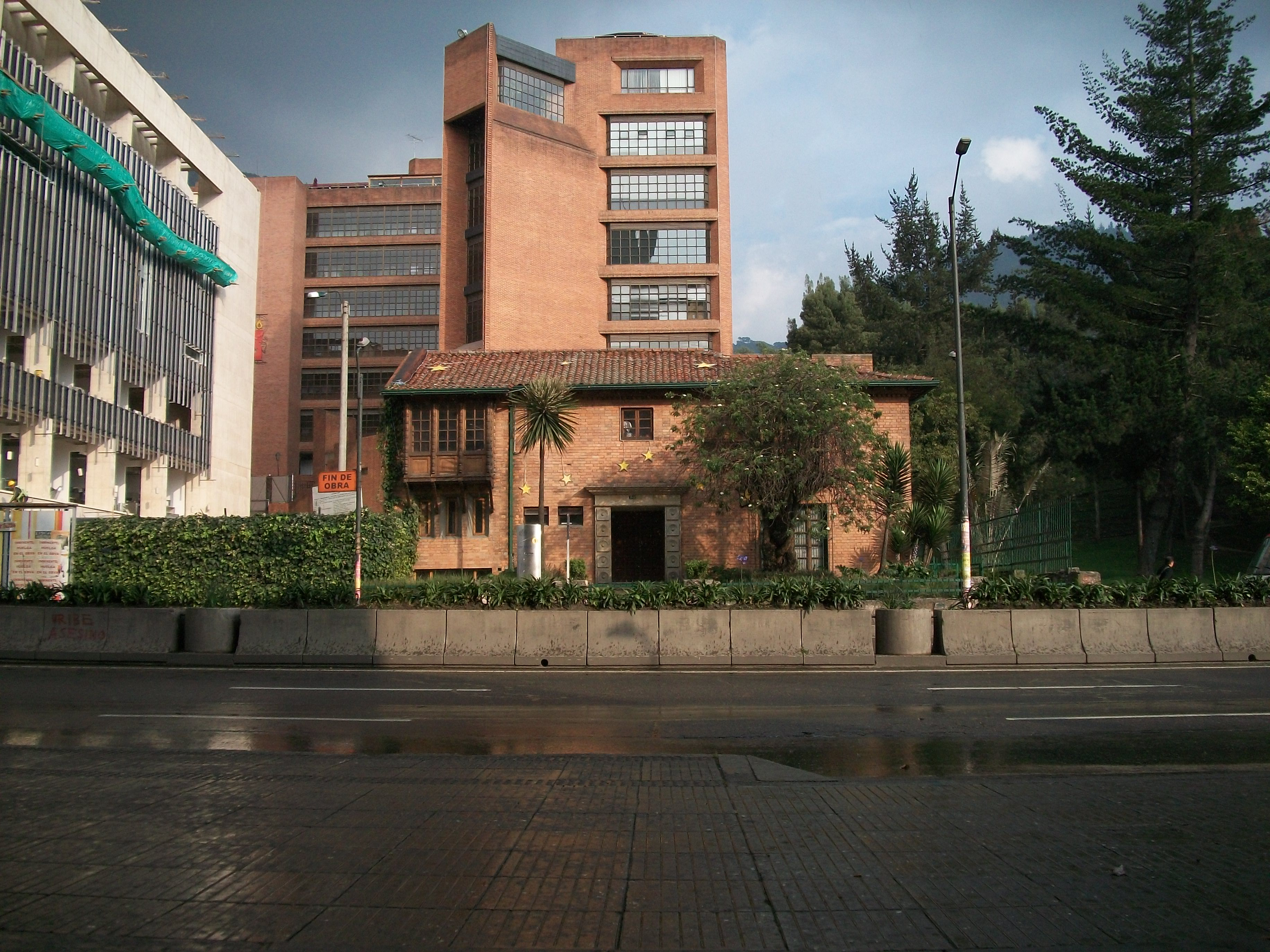
Universidad la Javeriana

This is a list of institutes providing research into the Muisca. The three most important universities in Bogotá have a department of anthropology to study the indigenous cultures of Colombia. While international research compared to the Inca, Aztec and Maya is quite limited, various other universities have provided knowledge about the Muisca and their culture.

== List Muisca research institutes ==
| Name | Country | Location | Topics | Notable researchers | Notes |
|---|---|---|---|---|---|
| University of the Andes | Colombia | Bogotá | Muisca society conquest | Schrimpff; Groot; Langebaek; Gamboa | |
| National University of Colombia | Colombia | Bogotá | economy art | Triana; Correal; Gamboa; Groot; Izquierdo | |
| Pontificia Universidad Javeriana | Colombia | Bogotá | society | Langebaek; François Correa; Ana María Gómez Londoño; Óscar Guarín | |
| Francisco José de Caldas District University | Colombia | Bogotá | astronomy | Bonilla Romero | |
| Universidad de San Buenaventura | Colombia | Bogotá | mythology | Luis Bohórquez | |
| Universidad del Quindío | Colombia | Armenia | religion | Susana Henao | |
| University of La Sabana | Colombia | Chía | art | Concepción Quintana de Afanador | |
| Universidad; Católica del Norte | Colombia | Santa Rosa de Osos | mummies cuisine | Abel Martínez | |
| University of Valle | Colombia | Cali | mummies | Abel Martínez | |
| Pedagogical and Technological University of Colombia | Colombia | Tunja | mythology religion | Silva Celis; Ocampo López; Adriana Segura | |
| Colombian Institute of Anthropology and History | Colombia | Bogotá | history language art | Broadbent; Correal; Gamboa; Clara Casilimas; Álvaro Botiva; Diego Martínez Celis | |
| University of California, Santa Barbara | United States | Santa Barbara, California | history religion | Juan F. Cobo Betancourt | |
| University of Pittsburgh | United States | Pittsburgh, Pennsylvania | society economy | Langebaek; Pedro Argüello; Michael Kruschek | |
| University of Central Florida | United States | Orlando, Florida | agriculturecuisine | Jorge García | |
| University of Alberta | Canada | Edmonton | economy | Francis | |
| Université de Montréal | Canada | Montreal | calendar | Izquierdo | |
| University of Barcelona | Spain | Barcelona | cuisine | Blanca Daza | |
| Complutense University of Madrid | Spain | Madrid | language | Manuel Alvar | |
| Autonomous University of Madrid | Spain | Madrid | conquest | Carlos Rey Pereira | |
| University of Trás‐os‐Montes and Alto Douro | Portugal | Vila Real | agriculture | Diana Rodríguez Gallo | |

== See also ==
- List of Muisca museum collections, Muisca scholars, Muisca sites
- List of flora and fauna named after the Muisca
- Muisca Confederation
- Muysccubun
