= Eliécer Silva Celis =

Colombian anthropologist (1914–2007)

dr. Eliécer Silva Celis
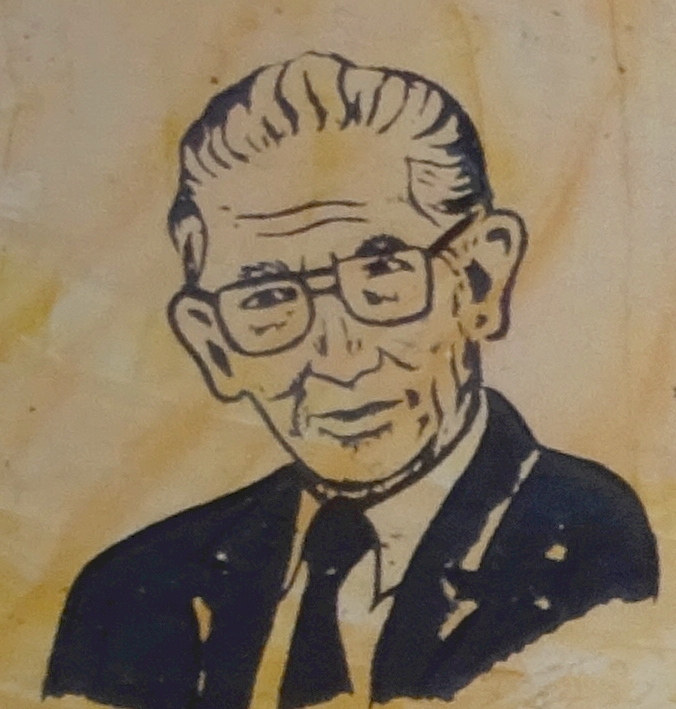
- Portrait of Silva Celis in his museum
- Born: January 20, 1914; Floresta, Boyacá; Colombia
- Died: July 4, 2007 (aged 93); Sogamoso, Colombia
- Known for: Archaeology, anthropology, mummies, Sun Temple
- Spouse: Lilia Montaña Barrera †
- Children: Miguel, Luis Guillermo, Margarita, Jaime Silva
- Scientific career
- Fields: Archaeology & anthropology of the Muisca

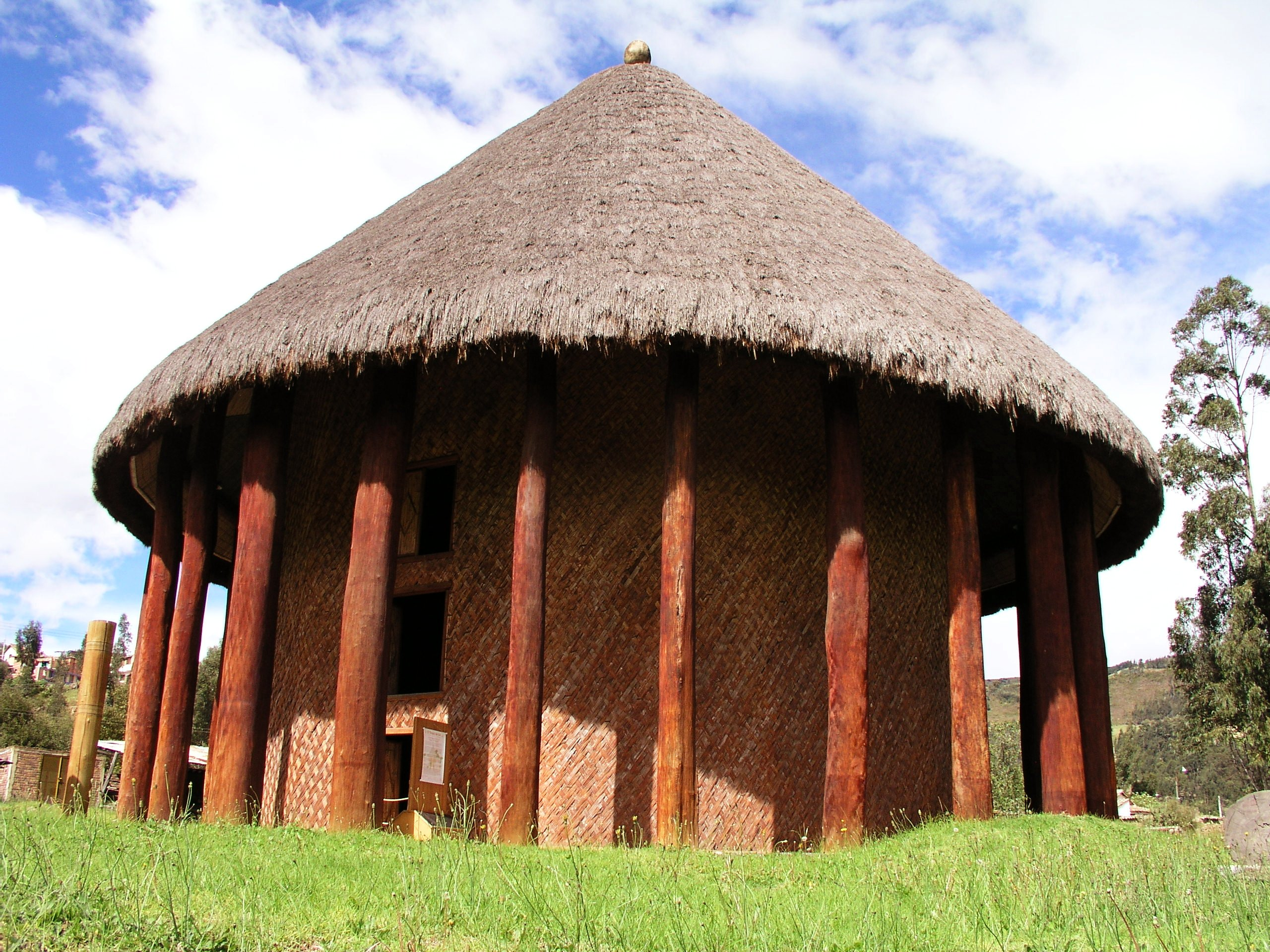
The Sun Temple of Suamox has been reconstructed by Eliécer Silva Celis

Eliécer Silva Celis (Floresta, Colombia, 20 January 1914 – Sogamoso, 4 July 2007) was a Colombian anthropologist, archaeologist, professor and writer. He is considered a pioneer in the anthropology of Colombia. Silva Celis is known in Colombia for the reconstruction of the Sun Temple, the most important temple of the Muisca religion.

Eliécer Silva Celis has published many books and articles about the Muisca and other indigenous groups of Colombia, only in Spanish.

== Biography ==
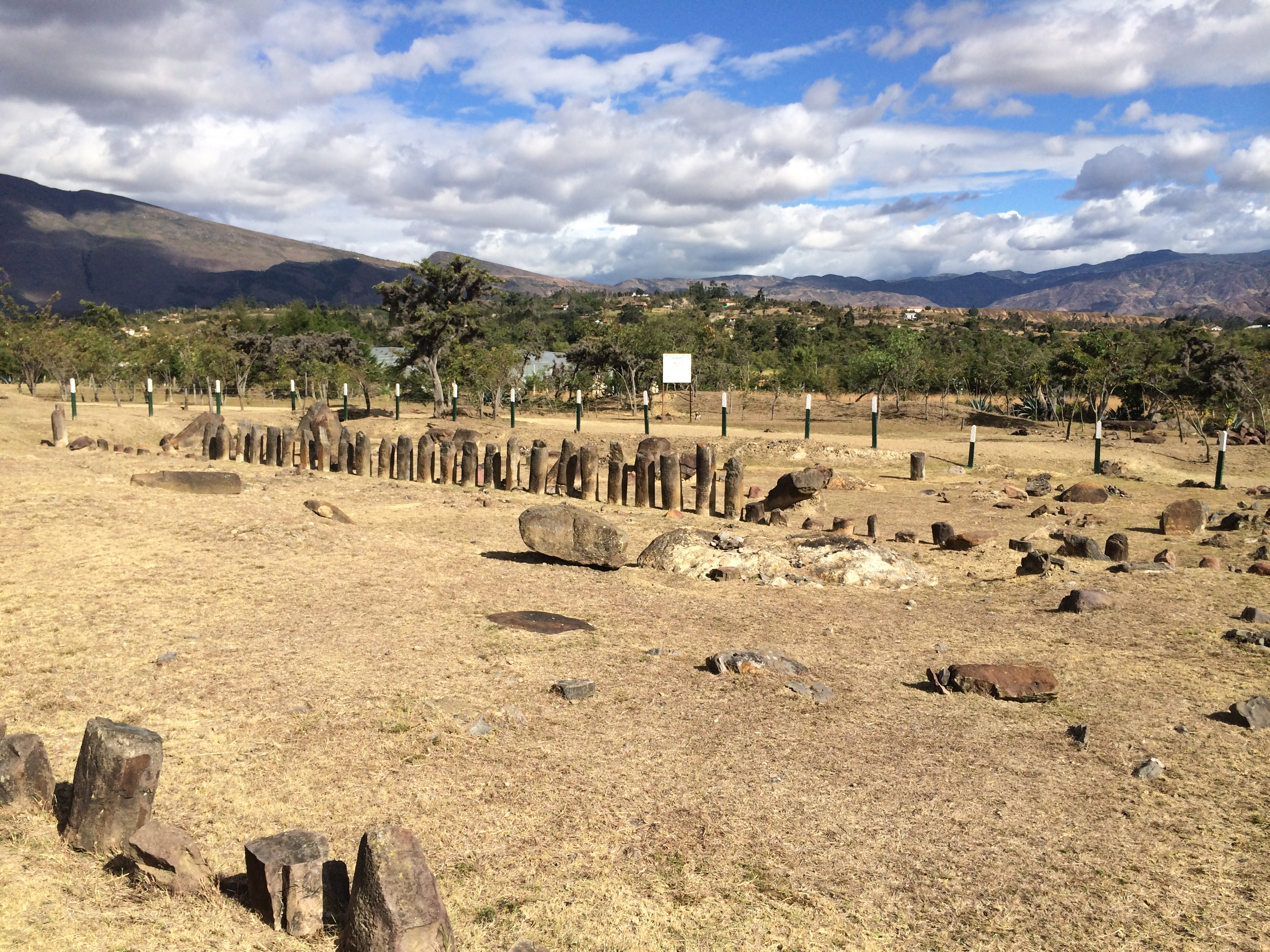
Silva Celis rediscovered the archaeoastronomical site El Infiernito and created the Archaeological Park around it

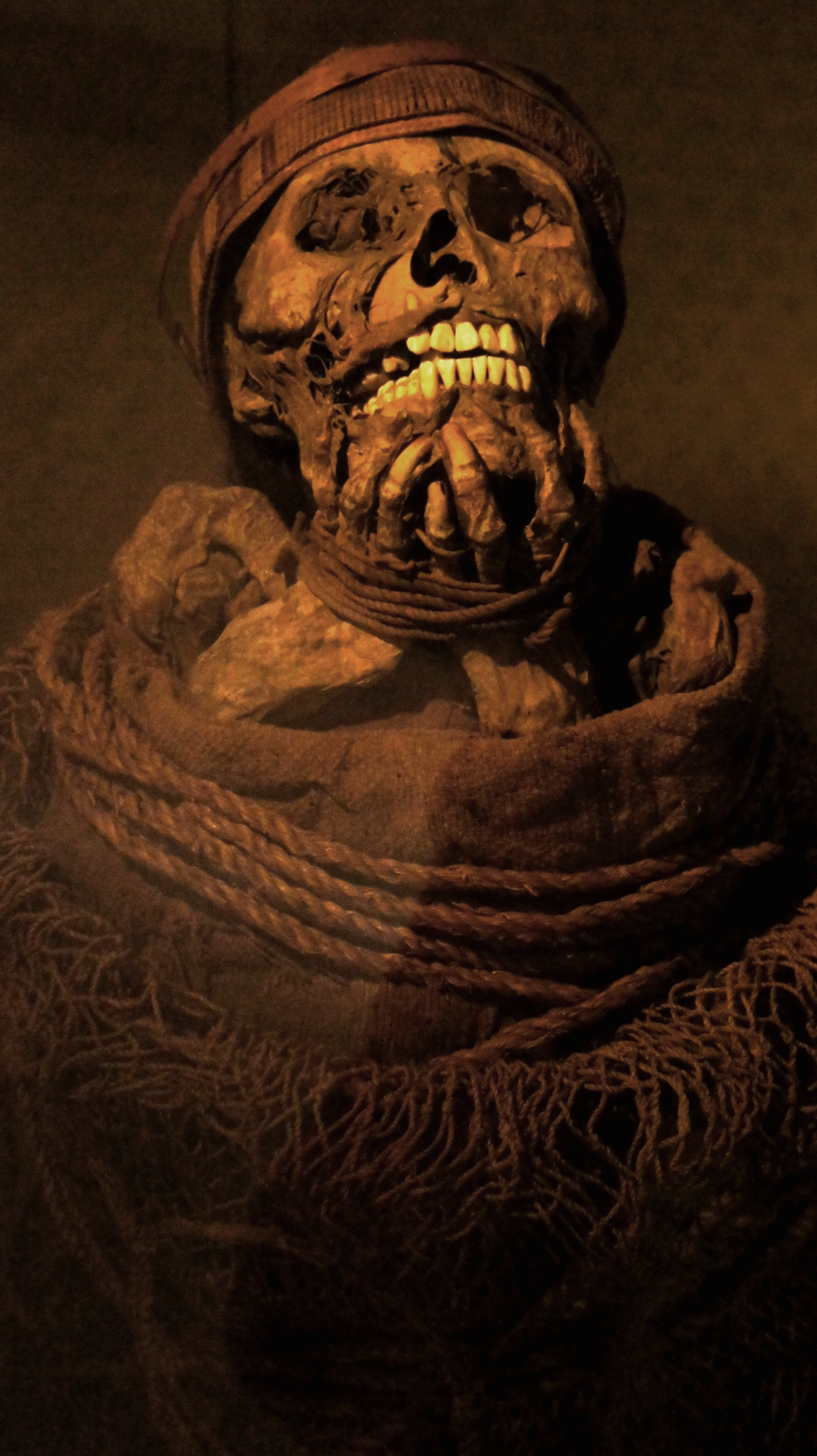
A Muisca mummy was donated to Eliécer Silva Celis in 1962

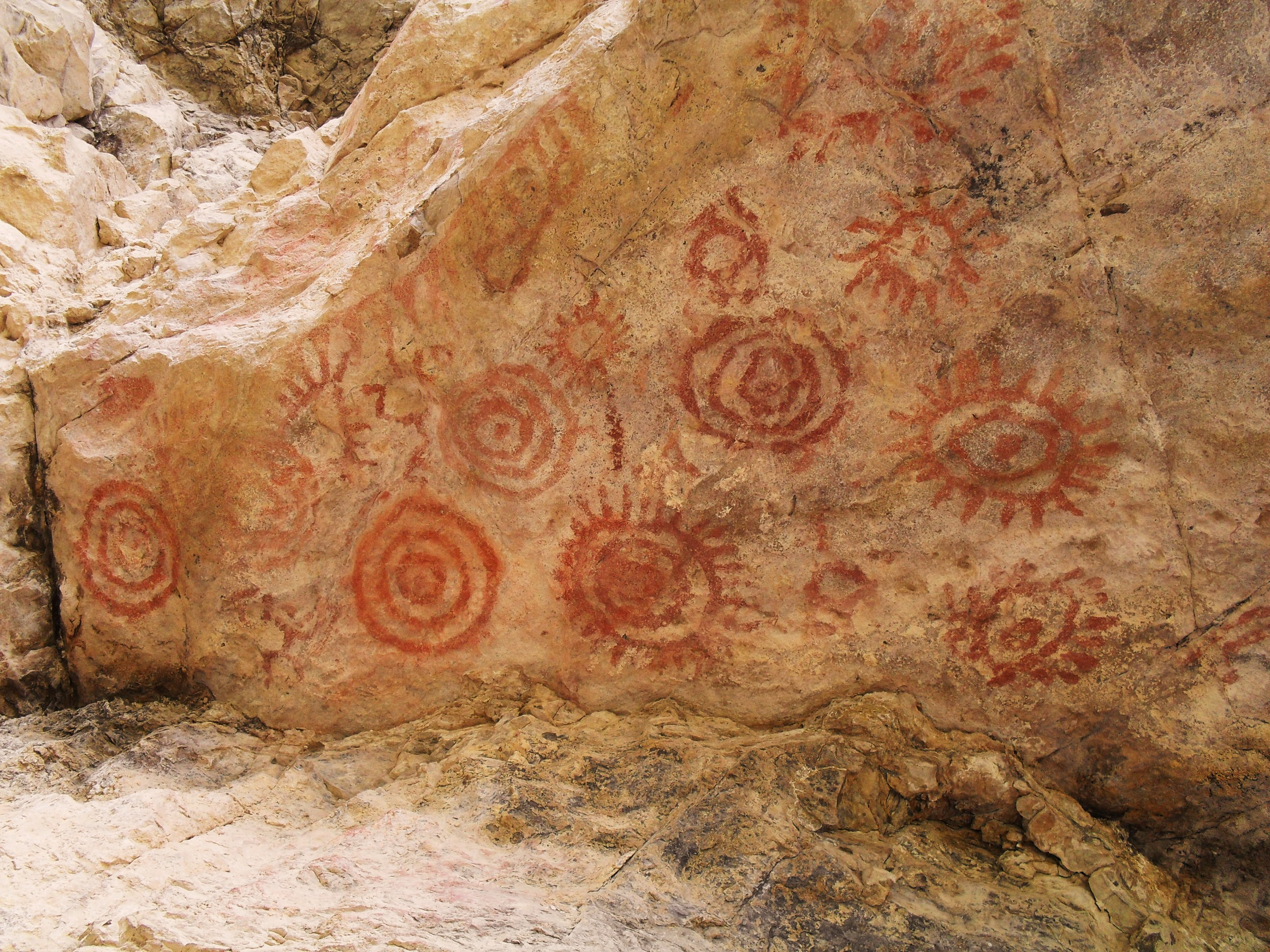
The rock art of Sáchica has been studied by Silva Celis

Eliécer Silva Celis was born in Tobasía, vereda of Floresta, Boyacá on January 20, 1914. He became an orphan at young age and worked as street vendor and at the construction of the railway of Antioquia.

In 1937, at age 23, Silva Celis managed to finish his secondary education. The same year he entered the Escuela Normal Superior de Colombia in Bogotá, where Silva Celis got to know later famous people who fled the Nazis in Europe: Paul Rivet, Rudolf Hommes, Justus W. Schottellius, José Francisco Socarras, Gregorio Hernández de Alba and José de Recasens, among others. They taught Silva Celis ethnology, archaeology, physical anthropology, history, philosophy and linguistics.

In 1942 Silva Celis uncovered a Muisca cemetery with indigenous tombs in the Mochacá neighbourhood in Sogamoso. He found Muisca mummies and could establish the precise location where the Temple of the Sun of the Muisca had been. The Temple, dedicated to Muisca Sun god Sué, was destroyed by soldiers in the army of Gonzalo Jiménez de Quesada on September 4, 1537. When De Quesada's soldiers Miguel Sánchez and Juan Rodríguez Parra raided the Sun Temple in September 1537, they found mummies decorated with golden crowns and other objects sitting on raised platforms. With the finding of the location of the temple, he founded the Parque Indígena del Sol, present-day site of the Archaeology Museum in Sogamoso. The museum hosts more than 5000 pieces of the Muisca civilisation. In this museum he also reconstructed the Sun Temple. Later, Eliécer Silva Celis rediscovered El Infiernito, close to Villa de Leyva, an astronomical observatory of the Muisca. Silva Celis founded the Archaeological Park in Monquirá.

In 1943, Eliécer Silva Celis found five skulls which were later dated to be between 8890 and 8630 years old.

In 1944, Silva Celis studied the famous Tierradentro culture of Huila, findings from La Belleza in Santander and in the following years the Lache of the Sierra Nevada del Cocuy.

The mummy from Sativanorte, named SO10-IX belongs to the collection of Silva Celis in the Archaeology Museum of Sogamoso. It has been studied in detail by various researchers. The mummy has been donated to Silva Celis by Abraham López Ávila in 1962. Interviews with López Ávila revealed that the mummy had been found by children in the vicinity of Sativanorte, Sativasur and Socotá on the western bank of the Chicamocha River.

Silva Celis was co-founder of the UPTC in Tunja, Boyacá in 1953. He served as rector of the university twice. In 1966, Silva Celis studied Muisca stones found in Mongua, Boyacá. Silva Celis has written more than 400 articles.

Eliécer Silva Celis died on July 4, 2007, at an age of 93 years, after dedicating more than 60 years of his life to knowledge about the Muisca and other indigenous groups in Colombia.

== Works ==
This list is a selection.

=== Books ===
- 2006 – Estudios sobre la cultura chibcha
- 1979 – Proyecto del parque arqueológico y botánico en villa de Leyva: sitio "El Infiernito"
- 1968 – Arqueología y prehistoria de Colombia; [Bochica o Nemqueteba]
- 1967 – Antiguedad de la civilizacin̤ Chibcha
- 1966 – Las estatuas de la Salina de Mongua
- 1945 – Contribucion al conocimiento de la civilización de los Lache

=== Articles ===
- 1965 – Una inspeccion arqueologica por el alto Rio Minero
- 1965 – Antigüedad y relaciones de la civilización Chibcha
- 1963 – Los petroglifos de "El Encanto" – Florencia, Caquetá
- 1963 – Movimiento de la civilización agustiniana sobre el alto Amazonas
- 1962 – Pinturas rupestres precolombinas de Sáchica, Valle de Leiva
- 1951 – Investigación de antropología social en Tota, Boyacá
- 1947 – Sobre arqueología y antropología Chibcha
- 1946 – Cráneos de Chiscas

== Trivia ==
- Honouring Silva Celis, the Archaeology Museum, Sogamoso, administered by his anthropologist daughter, has been renamed after him

== See also ==
- List of Muisca scholars
- Muisca art
- Muisca
- Muisca mummification, Sun Temple
- El Infiernito, Archaeology Museum Silva Celis, Sáchica

== Notable works by Silva Celis ==
- Silva Celis, Eliécer (1963), "Los petroglifos de "El Encanto" – Florencia, Caquetá – The petroglyphs of "El Encanto" – Florencia, Caquetá", Revista Colombiana de Antropología (in Spanish), XII: 10–87
- Silva Celis, Eliécer (1963), "Movimiento de la civilización agustiniana sobre el alto Amazonas – Movement of the Augustinian civilization around the High Amazone", Revista Colombiana de Antropología (in Spanish), XII: 390–400
- Silva Celis, Eliécer (1962), "Pinturas rupestres precolombinas de Sáchica, Valle de Leiva – Pre-Columbian rock art of Sáchica, Leyva Valley", Revista Colombiana de Antropología (in Spanish), X: 9–36

== Bibliography ==
- Ardila Silva, Ximena; Correal Cabezas, Ximena (2010), El patrimonio cultural nos incluye a todos. Fundación Eliécer Silva Celis: una organización inteligente – The cultural heritage includes us all. Foundation Eliécer Silva Celis: an intelligent organisation (PDF) (in Spanish), Universidad del Rosario, pp. 1–97
- Martínez Martín, Abel Fernando; Meléndez, Bernardo Francisco; Manrique, Fred Gustavo (2010), "Bio-anthropology and paleopathology of the SO10-IX Muisca mummy from Sátivanorte, Boyacá, Colombia", Colombia Médica, 41 (2), Universidad del Valle: 112–120, ISSN 1657-9534
- Otálora Cascante, Andrés Ricardo (2006), "Caracterización bioantropológica de una momia muisca: implicaciones metodológicas desde la antropología biológica – Bioanthropologist's characterization of a Muisca mummy: methodologist's implications from the biologist anthropology", Revista Salud, Historia y Sanidad (in Spanish), 1 (1): 4–9
- Rodríguez Cuenca, José Vicente (2007), "Profesor Eliécer Silva Celis (1914–2007): un Sugamuxi dedicado a la causa muisca – Professor Eliécer Silva Celis (1914–2007): a Sugamuxi devoted to the muisca cause", Maguaré (in Spanish), 21, Universidad Nacional: 111–127, ISSN 0120-3045
