= Javier Ocampo López =

Colombian historian, writer, folklorist and professor

dr. Javier Ocampo López Doctor Honoris Causa en Ciencias Sociales (2007)
- Born: June 19, 1939 (age 85); Aguadas, Caldas, Colombia
- Citizenship: Colombian
- Known for: Historical biographies, Colombian folklore books
- Children: Olga Lucía, María Teresa, Jorge Enrique, Ángela María, Laura Cristina
- Awards: Premio Nacional de Historia, Mexico (1968); Premio Nacional de Literatura "José María Vergara y Vergara", Colombia (1975)
- Scientific career
- Fields: History, Colombian folklore, religion, mythology
- Institutions: Universidad Nacional Autónoma de México
- Thesis: Las ideas de un día. El pueblo mexicano ante la consumación de su independencia (1969)

Javier Ocampo López (born 19 June 1939) is a Colombian historian, writer, folklorist and professor. He has been important in the fields of Colombian folklore and history of Latin America and Colombia, especially contributing on the department of Boyacá, the homeland of the Muisca and their religion and mythology. He wrote exclusively in Spanish.

== Biography ==
Javier Ocampo López was born in Aguadas, a village famous for the pasillo (a Colombian type of waltz), in the department of Caldas in west-central Colombia to parents Francisco Ocampo Gutiérrez and Doña Teresa López Hurtado. He has one brother, Fabio. In 1956 he finished his secondary education as best student of his class. Ocampo has played the clarinet since the age of twelve and was a member of the music group of his village of birth.

Ocampo began his higher studies in 1956 at the Facultad de Ciencias Sociales y Económicas ("Faculty of Social and Economical Sciences") of the Pedagogical and Technological University of Colombia. He obtained his degree in social sciences.

Ocampo López obtained his PhD at El Colegio de México in 1969 with his thesis titled Las ideas de un día. El pueblo mexicano ante la consumación de su independencia ("Ideas of one day. The Mexican people before the consummation of their independence").

Over the course of 57 years, Ocampo López has been the author of 100 books, co-authored 47, and published 200 studies in specialized literature and national and international newspapers.

In 1960 he taught at the Colegio Nacional Académico in Cartago (Valle del Cauca). From 1963 he taught at the Pedagogical and Technological University of Colombia in Tunja.

Ocampo wrote several biographies about Colombian historical figures; presidents, generals and others; Antonio Villavicencio, Julián Trujillo Largacha, Santos Gutiérrez, María Antonia Santos Plata, Manuel Antonio Sanclemente, Eustorgio Salgar, Gustavo Rojas Pinilla, Manuel Rodríguez Torices, Antonio José de Sucre, José Miguel Pey, José Manuel Marroquín, Carlos Holguín, José de Obaldía, José Eusebio Otálora.

A public library in his birthplace Aguadas has been named in his honour.

== Works ==
This list is a selection.

=== Books ===
- 2013 – Mitos y leyendas indígenas de Colombia
- 2011 – El proceso ideológico de la independencia
- 2007 – Grandes culturas indígenas de América
- 2006 – El folclor y las fiestas en Colomba
- 2006 – Mitos, leyendas y relatos colombianos
- 2001 – Mitos y leyendas de Antioquia la Grande
- 1996 – Leyendas populares colombianas
- 1977 – El pueblo boyacense y su folclor

=== Articles ===
- 1993 – Fiestas religiosas y romerías. El abigarrado mundo de las devociones populares en Colombia
- 1974 – El proceso ideológico de la emancipación
- 1970 – La artesanía popular boyacense y su importancia en la geografía turística y económica

== See also ==
- List of Muisca scholars, ICANH
- Muisca
- Muisca mythology, religion

== Notable works by Ocampo López ==
- Ocampo López, Javier (2013), Mitos y leyendas indígenas de Colombia - Indigenous myths and legends of Colombia (in Spanish), Bogotá, Colombia: Plaza & Janes Editores Colombia S.A., pp. 1–219, ISBN 978-958-14-1416-1
- Ocampo López, Javier (2007), Grandes culturas indígenas de América - Great indigenous cultures of the Americas (in Spanish), Bogotá, Colombia: Plaza & Janes Editores Colombia S.A., pp. 1–238, ISBN 978-958-14-0368-4
- Ocampo López, Javier (2001), El imaginario en Boyacá: la identidad del pueblo boyacense y su proyección en la simbología regional (Volume 2: El imaginario colectivo en los pensadores boyacenses), Bogotá, Colombia: Universidad Distrital Francisco José de Caldas, pp. 1–157, ISBN 978-958-9160-90-9
- Ocampo López, Javier (1996), Leyendas populares colombianas - Popular Colombian legends (in Spanish), Plaza y Janes Editores, pp. 1–384, ISBN 9789581402670
