= El Infiernito =

Archaeoastronomical site in Colombia

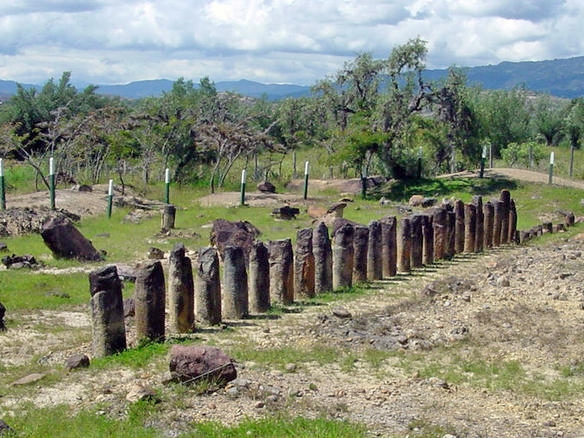
- El Infiernito ("The Little Hell"); ancient astronomical site

- Location within Colombia
- 5°38′50.63″N 73°33′31.41″W
- Type: Archaeoastronomical site
- Periods: pre-Herrera Period-Late Muisca
- Cultures: Herrera-Muisca
- Satellite of: Muisca Confederation
- Location: Villa de Leyva, Boyacá
- Region: Altiplano Cundiboyacense, Colombia
- Part of: Pre-Muisca sites

Site notes
- Material: Sandstone
- Archaeologists: Eliécer Silva Celis, Carl Henrik Langebaek et al.
- Public access: Yes

El Infiernito (Spanish for "The Little Hell"), is a pre-Columbian archaeoastronomical site located on the Altiplano Cundiboyacense in the outskirts of Villa de Leyva, Boyacá, Colombia. It is composed of several earthworks surrounding a setting of menhirs (upright standing stones); several burial mounds are also present. The site was a center of religious ceremonies and spiritual purification rites, and also served as an astronomical observatory.

== History ==
The area was known by this name long before the discovery of the archaeological site. Spanish Conquistadors called it infiernito, or "little hell," because they thought it was diabolical and labeled it as a site of Pagan worship. The first description of the site was made in 1847 by the Colombian army geographer Joaquin Acosta, who reported 25 stone columns, half-buried in the Monquirá Valley. The findings were studied by Alexander von Humboldt who believed that the site could be used to anticipate astronomical phenomena such as solstices and equinoxes, as indicated by the alignment of the stones with the sun and moon.

== Description ==
The lithic pieces are carved in pink sandstone, many of them in columnar shapes with an incised ring. A total of 109 monoliths have been excavated to date: 54 in the north stone row and 55 in the south, aligned in an east–west orientation, apparently representing the Muisca calendar, dividing the area in two main parts: the north sacred field (Infiernito N° 1) and the south sacred field (Infiernito N° 2).

== Chronology ==
Archaeological excavations have collected a large number of samples of wood charcoal which have been useful for radiocarbon dating. Three distinct stratigraphic levels can be observed, showing an early inhabitation of the Altiplano Cundiboyacense:

- IAN - 119 - "El Infiernito", N° 2: 2.490 ± 195 years Before Present
- IAN - 128 - "El Infiernito", N° 1: 2.180 ± 140 BP
- IAN - 148 - "El Infiernito", N° 2: 2.880 ± 95 BP

The first stratum is rich in animal remains, vegetal ashes, red ochre, incienso and resins. The second one shows mainly remains of maize oblations. In the third stratum, several pieces of burned carved rocks and lithic flakes, in the remains of a large bonfire, are gathered around a large monolith in the south sacred field.

== Threats ==
The first formal archaeological excavations at the site were led by anthropologist Eliecer Silva Celis in 1981; these resulted in the declaration of the site as an archaeological park. The burial mounds were found to have been heavily affected by grave robbery, and the human remains dispersed. The central column (about 5 meters high) described by Joaquin Acosta in 1850, which apparently allowed the measuring of the sun's astronomical alignment during the equinoxes, was missing. The column alignments have been the subject of a more detailed study by archaeoastronomer Juan Morales who has found that the main columns are aligned at an azimuth of 91° to the top of Morro Negro hill pointing to the rise of the sun in the equinox. The summer solstice sun will be seen from the columns rising above the sacred Lake Iguaque, birthplace of the Muisca.

== Other monuments ==
Other lithic monuments of the Muisca culture exist in Sutamarchán, Tunja, Ramiriquí, Tibaná and Paz de Río among other locations.

== See also ==
- Archaeoastronomy
- Muisca astronomy, calendar
- Lake Iguaque, Villa de Leyva, Carl Henrik Langebaek, Eliécer Silva Celis
