= Sun Temple (Sogamoso) =

Archaeological site in Colombia

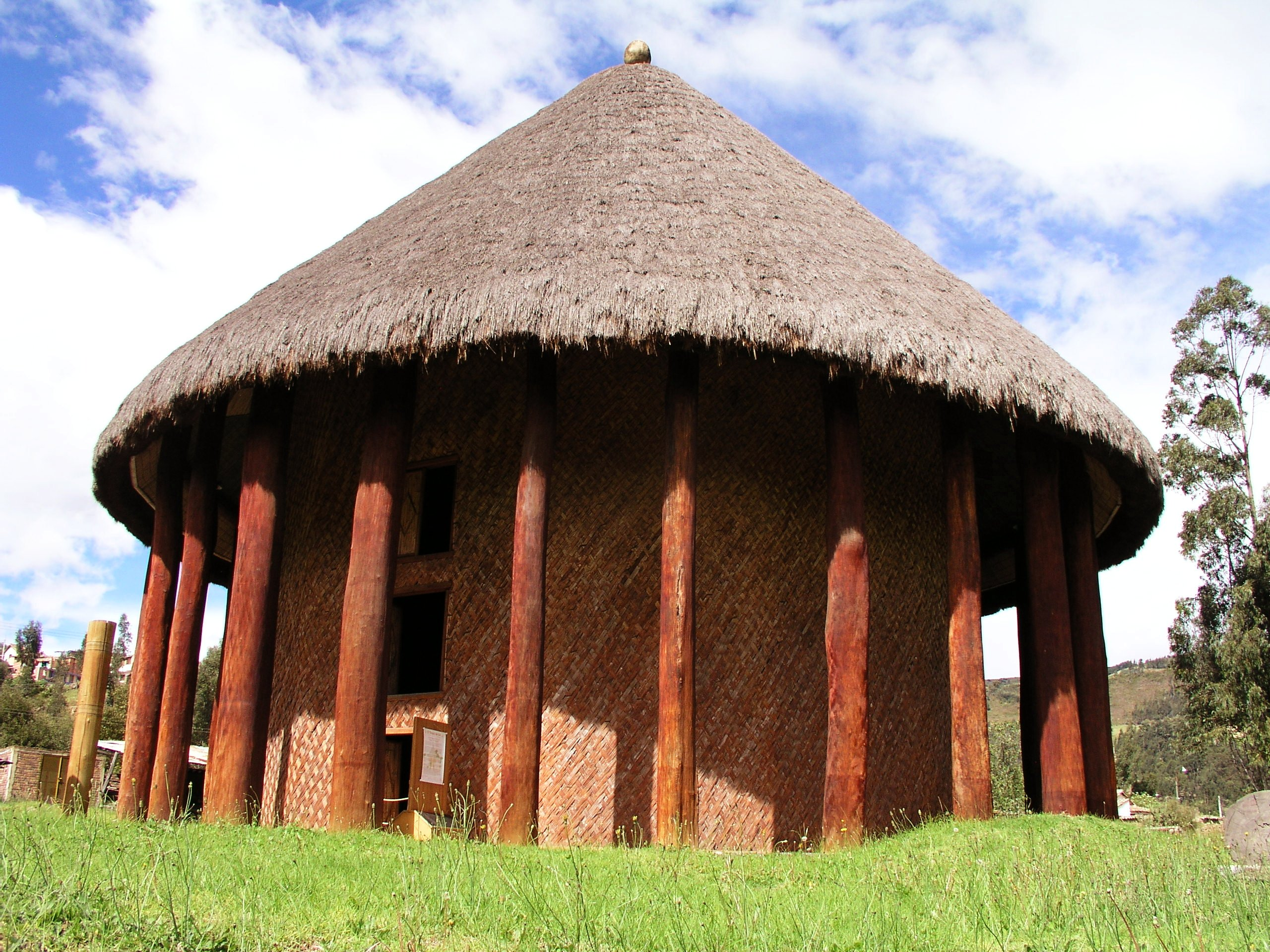
- Reconstruction of the Sun Temple; Archaeology Museum, Sogamoso

- Location within Colombia
- 5°42′34.57″N 72°55′34.98″W
- Type: Temple
- Periods: Late Muisca
- Cultures: Muisca
- Satellite of: Sugamuxi
- Associated with: Sugamuxi
- Location: Sogamoso, Boyacá
- Region: Altiplano Cundiboyacense, Colombia
- Part of: Archaeology Museum, Sogamoso; Muisca sites

History
- Abandoned: Spanish conquest

Site notes
- Material: Wood, clay, reed
- Elevation: 2,503 m (8,212 ft)
- Height: 18 metres (59 ft)
- Excavation dates: 1942
- Archaeologists: Eliécer Silva Celis
- Condition: Destroyed, reconstructed
- Public access: Yes

The Sun Temple of Sogamoso was a temple constructed by the Muisca as a place of worship for their Sun god Sué. The temple was built in Sogamoso, Colombia, then part of the Muisca Confederation and called Sugamuxi. It was the most important temple in the religion of the Muisca. The temple was destroyed by fire brought by the Spanish conquistadores led by Gonzalo Jiménez de Quesada who was eager to find the legendary El Dorado. A reconstruction has been built in the Archeology Museum of Sogamoso.

== Structure and worship ==
Coat of arms of Sogamoso; City of the Sun

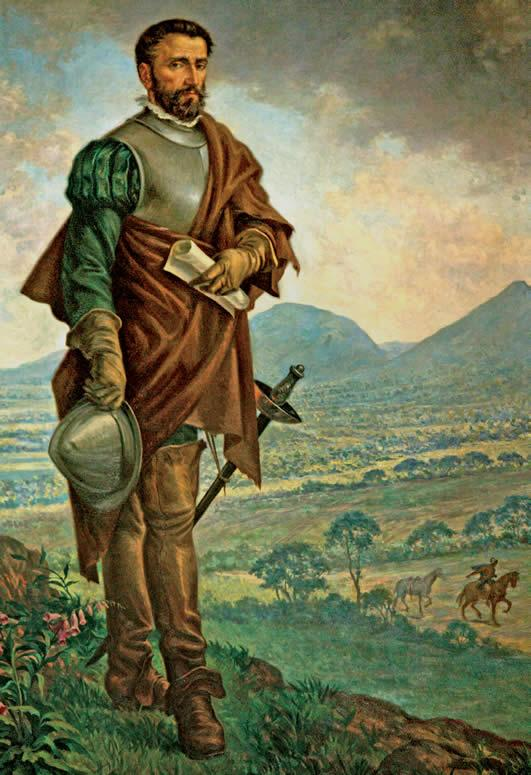
Soldiers in the army of Gonzalo Jiménez de Quesada destroyed the temple with their torches

The Temple of the Sun was built on the right banks of the small river Monquirá. The temple was a large round structure made of poles and clay with a roof made of reed. The temple did not have any windows. The columns surrounding the temple were built in three concentric rings made of wood harvested in Casanare. The temple represented the cosmos and was built to honour Sun god Sué. The temple also was a burial ground for the most important caciques and priests (Chibcha: ogques).

The Muisca had a working knowledge of astronomy and constructed various sites across their territories. El Infiernito, just outside Villa de Leyva has survived. The Sun Temple was constructed according to the positions of the Sun.

At the temple rituals were organised by the caciques and zaques of the Muisca Confederation. The mythological Idacansás held gatherings where children (moxas) were sacrificed. He made the city of Sugamuxi a sacred place. Mythical Thomagata was believed to travel each night between Tunja and the temple, a march he repeated ten times per night.

=== Destruction ===
Spanish conquistador Jiménez de Quesada heard of the Sun Temple and entered Sogamoso in early September 1537. He arrived in the afternoon and decided to wait until the next morning to take the cacique of Sugamuxi out of the temple.

Curious to see the treasures in the temple, two of his soldiers, Miguel Sánchez and Juan Rodríguez Parra went to the sacred place on the night of September 4, lighting their way with torches. When they entered the temple they found rich ornaments and mummies of ancient nobles. While they were collecting parts of the treasures of the temple they accidentally set fire to it with their torches destroying the temple.

=== Reconstruction ===
In 1942, archeologist Eliécer Silva Celis uncovered a Muisca cemetery in Sogamoso. The cemetery contained tombs of indigenous Muisca with mummies still preserved. Based on his archeological findings, he was able to locate the original site of the temple and decided to reconstruct it.

The replica of the temple is 18 metres (59 ft) high. The symbols in the dome tell the story of the creation of the Earth by Chiminigagua, the Supreme Being of the Muisca. The small openings on the sides serve as a calendar; every year on December 22 the sunlight falls right on the central pillar. Around the temple the cemetery with mummies, that were originally displayed inside the temple, is reconstructed. Today the temple is part of the Archeology Museum of Sogamoso, governed by the Pedagogical and Technological University of Colombia based in Tunja.

== See also ==
- Muisca mummification
- Sué - god of the Sun of the Muisca
- Muisca religion, Moon Temple, Cojines del Zaque, Piedras del Tunjo
