= Archaeology Museum, Sogamoso =

Museum in Colombia

Archaeology Museum
- Museo Arqueológico de Sogamoso
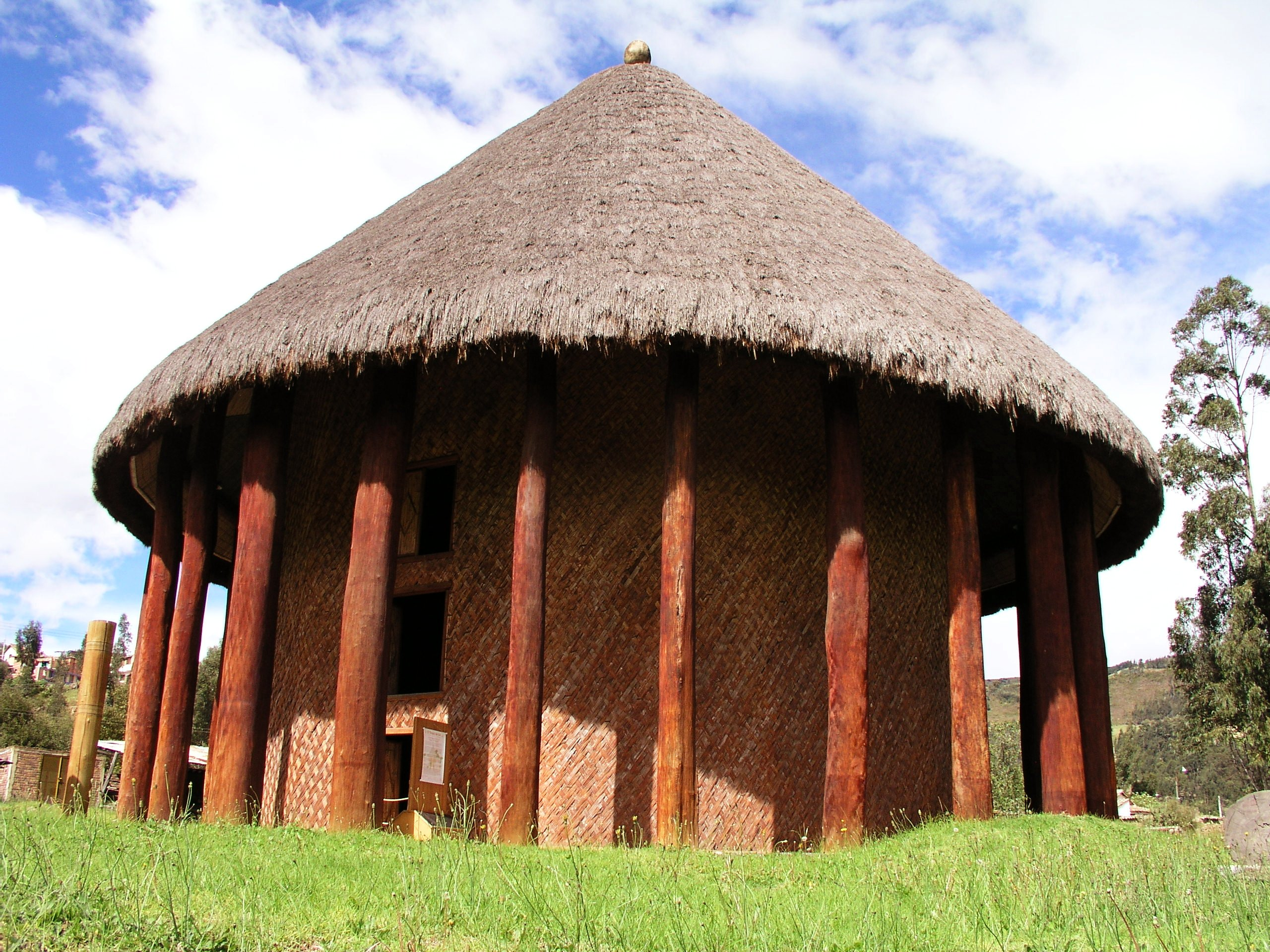
- The reconstructed Sun Temple

- Location within Colombia
- Established: 1942
- Location: Calle 9ª No. 6-45; Sogamoso, Colombia
- Coordinates: 5°42′34″N 72°55′27″W
- Type: Archaeology
- Collection size: 4000
- Founder: Eliécer Silva Celis
- Director: Margarita Silva Montaña
- Curators: UPTC, Tunja
- Website: Website

The Archaeology Museum of Sogamoso, officially titled the Parque Museo Arqueológico "Eliecer Silva Celis", is a museum on the archaeological findings in the area of sacred City of the Sun Sogamoso, Boyacá, Colombia. The museum hosts 4000 pieces of the Muisca and the Herrera Period. The museum was founded in 1942 by archaeologist Eliécer Silva Celis who helped building the reconstruction of the Sun Temple in the museum. The archaeology museum is since 1953 curated by the Universidad Pedagógica y Tecnológica de Colombia, based in Tunja.

== Description ==
The museum contains an archaeological park, paleontology, pre-Columbian and Muisca sections. An area is dedicated to the mining of carbon, musical instruments and cloths of the Muisca, mummies, metallurgy and reconstructions of the bohíos (houses) of the Muisca. The main attraction is the reconstructed Sun Temple of 18 metres (59 ft) high.

The museum also hosts a sculpture of the last iraca of Sogamoso; Sugamuxi.

The museum organises workshops and around the winter solstice the Fiesta del Huán, related with the Conchucua fountain where the iraca would take his bath.

In 2015, a grave was discovered on the terrain of the museum.

== Gallery ==
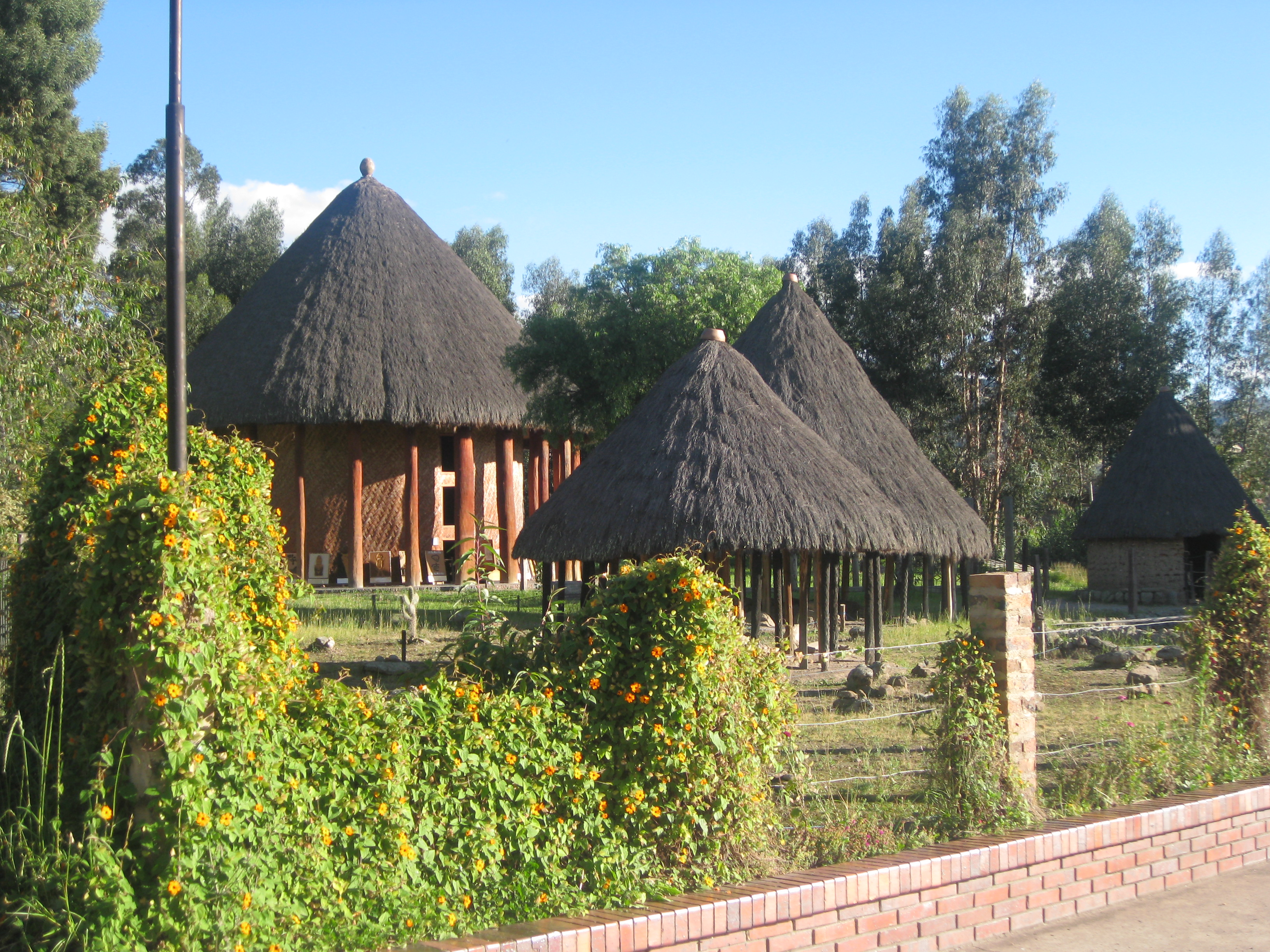
Malokas

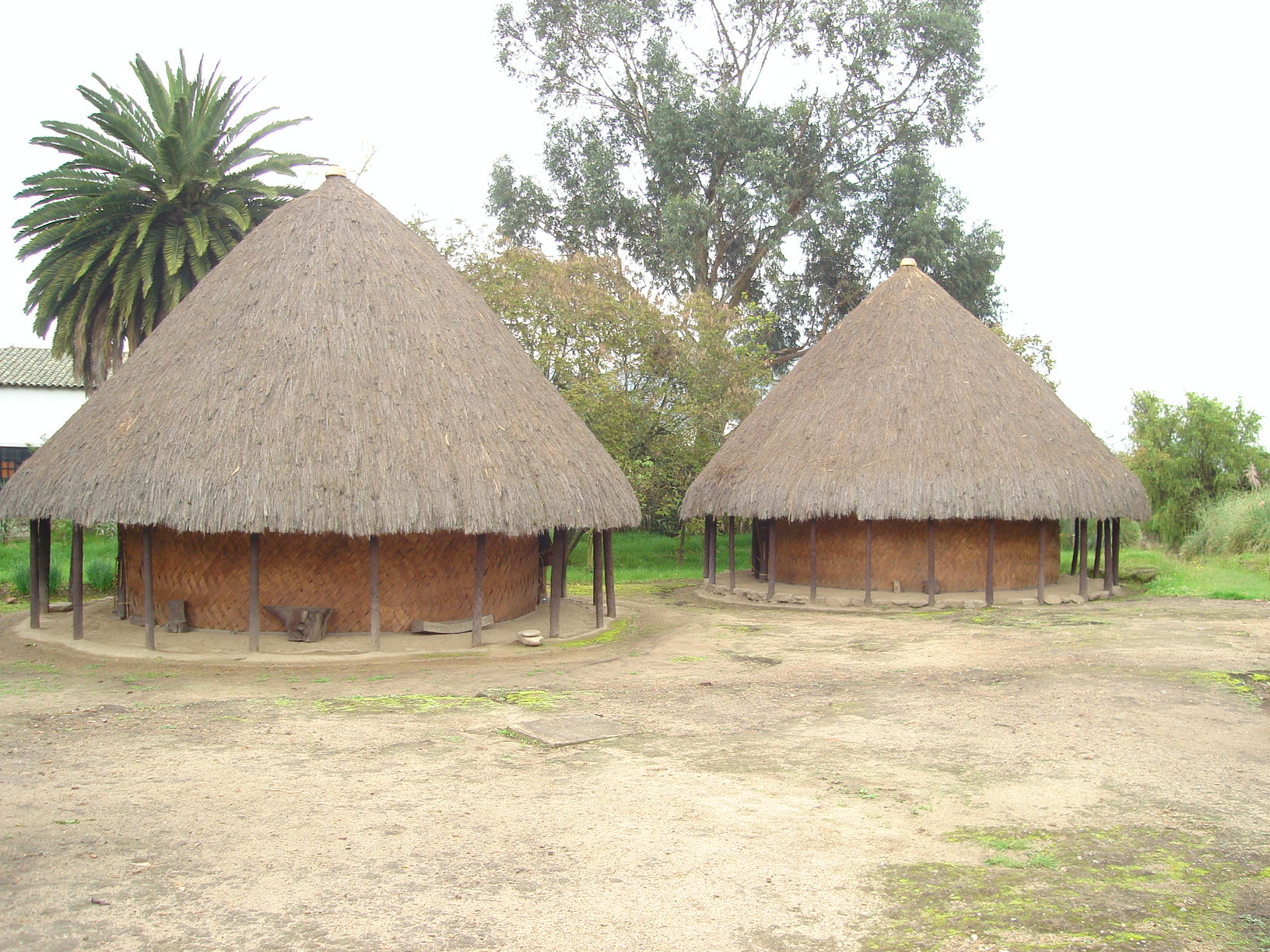
Bohíos

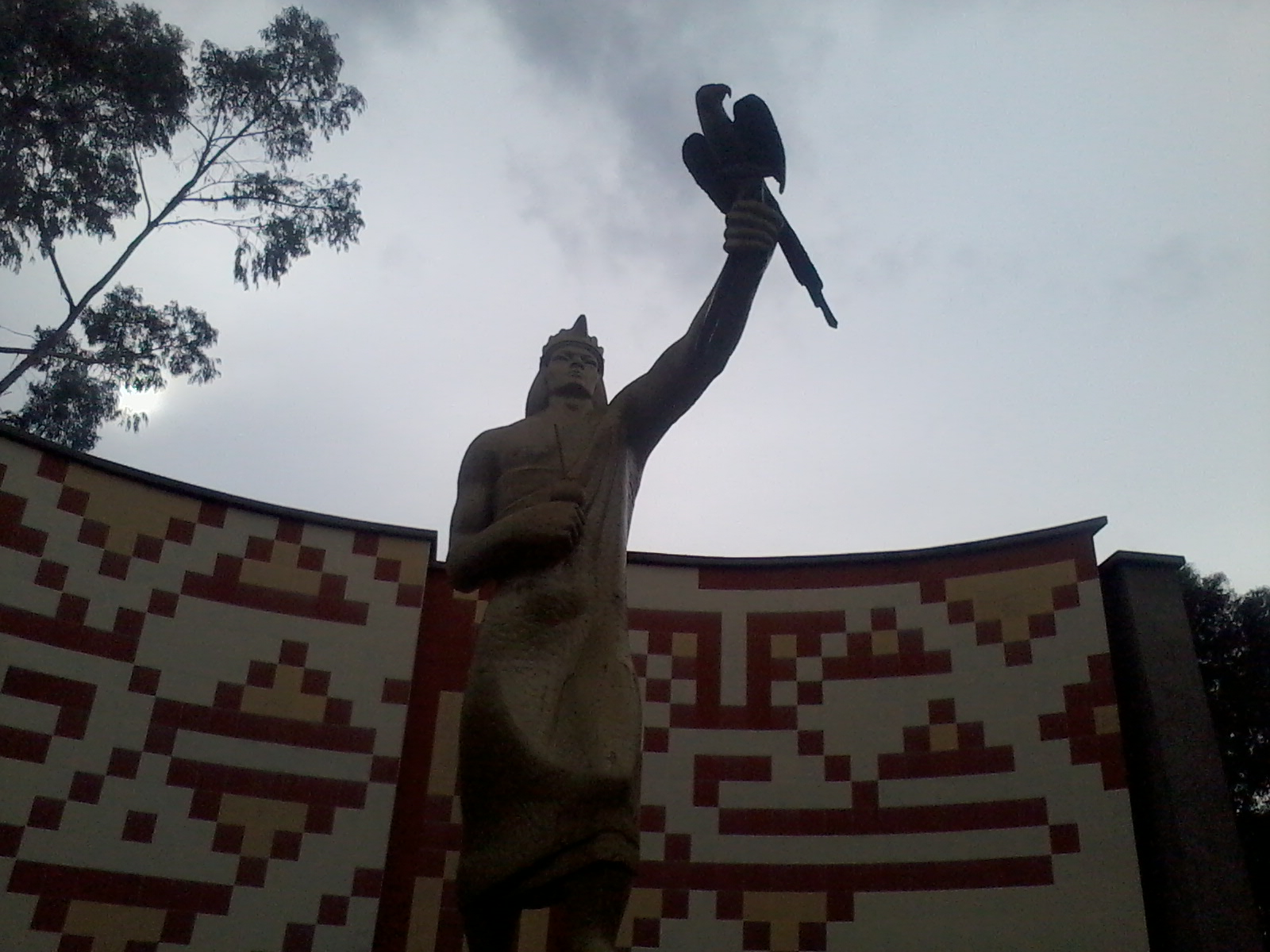
Sculpture of Sugamuxi

== See also ==
- Muisca
- Archeological Museum of Pasca
