= Archaeology Museum, Pasca =

Museum in Colombia

Archaeology Museum
- Museo Arqueológico de Pasca
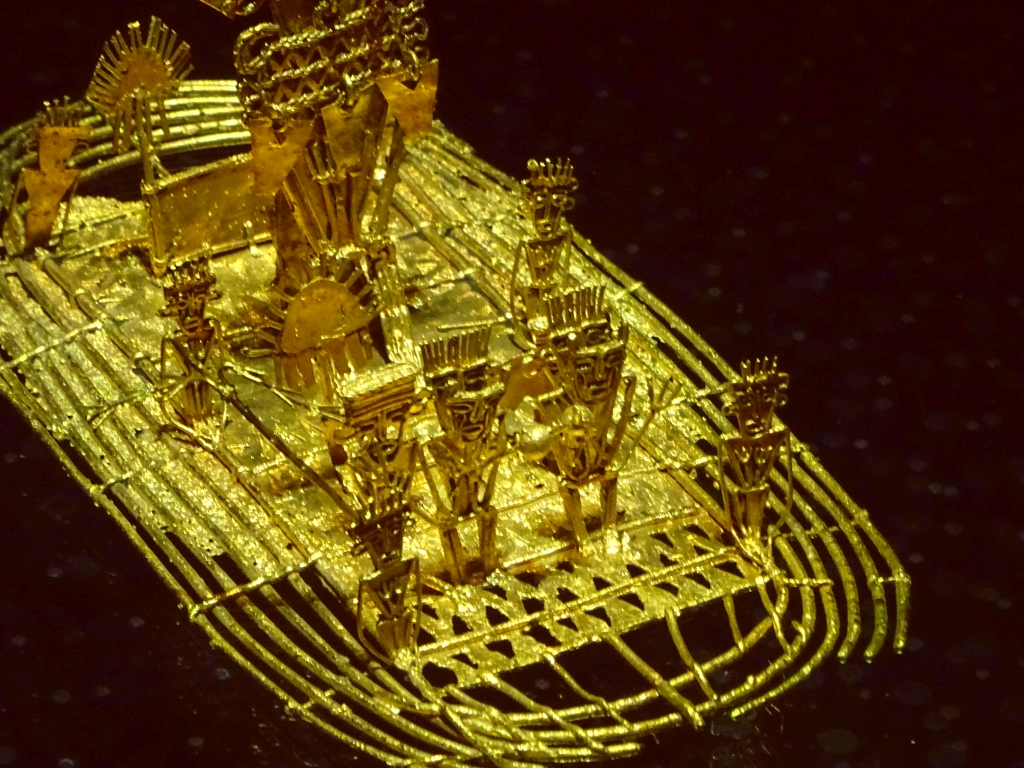
- The museum holds a replica of the famous Muisca raft

- Location within Colombia
- Established: 1969
- Location: Calle 1 with Carrera 5 Pasca, Colombia
- Coordinates: 04°18′31.8″N 74°17′59.3″W
- Type: Archaeology
- Collection size: 2500
- Founder: Jaime Hincapié Santamaría
- Website: Website

The Archaeology Museum of Pasca (Spanish: Museo Arqueológico de Pasca) is an archaeological museum located in Pasca, Colombia. It houses a great collection of Pre-Columbian objects and human remains, including Muisca mummies. It has a replica of the famous golden raft, Balsa Muisca, found near this town that represents the El Dorado rite. The museum hosts a piece of Muisca textile from Belén, Boyacá. The total collection numbers 2500 pieces. Apart from the Muisca artifacts, the museum hosts material from the Tairona, Calima, Quimbaya, Sinú, San Agustín and Tierradentro, among others.

It also has a botanic garden, with stuffed animals and a large insectarium. It was founded in 1969 by the Roman Catholic priest Jaime Hincapié Santamaría.

== See also ==
- Gold Museum, Bogotá
- Archaeology Museum, Sogamoso
