= Tunjo =

Figures in the art of the Muisca, Columbia

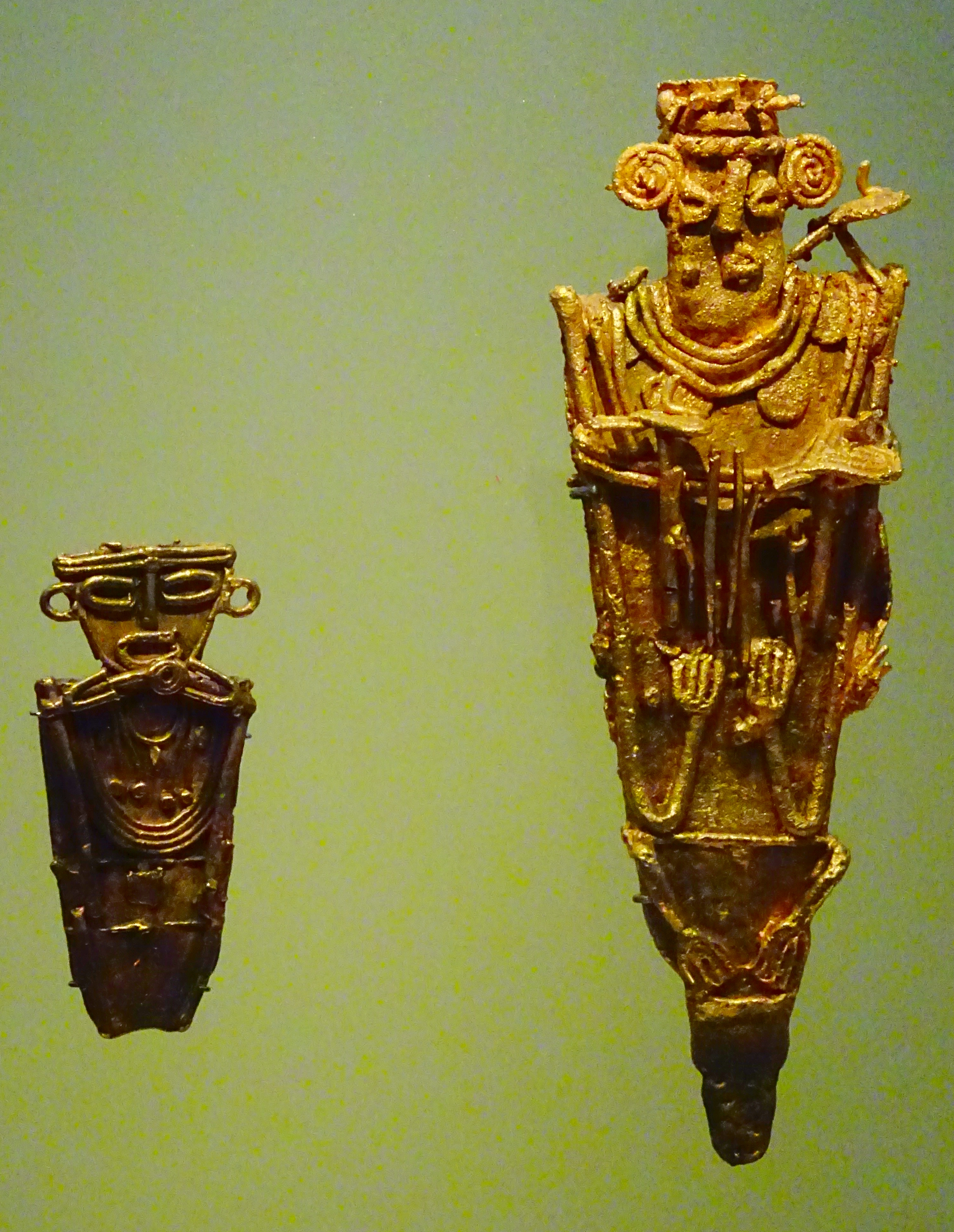
Tunjos in the Museo del Oro, Bogotá

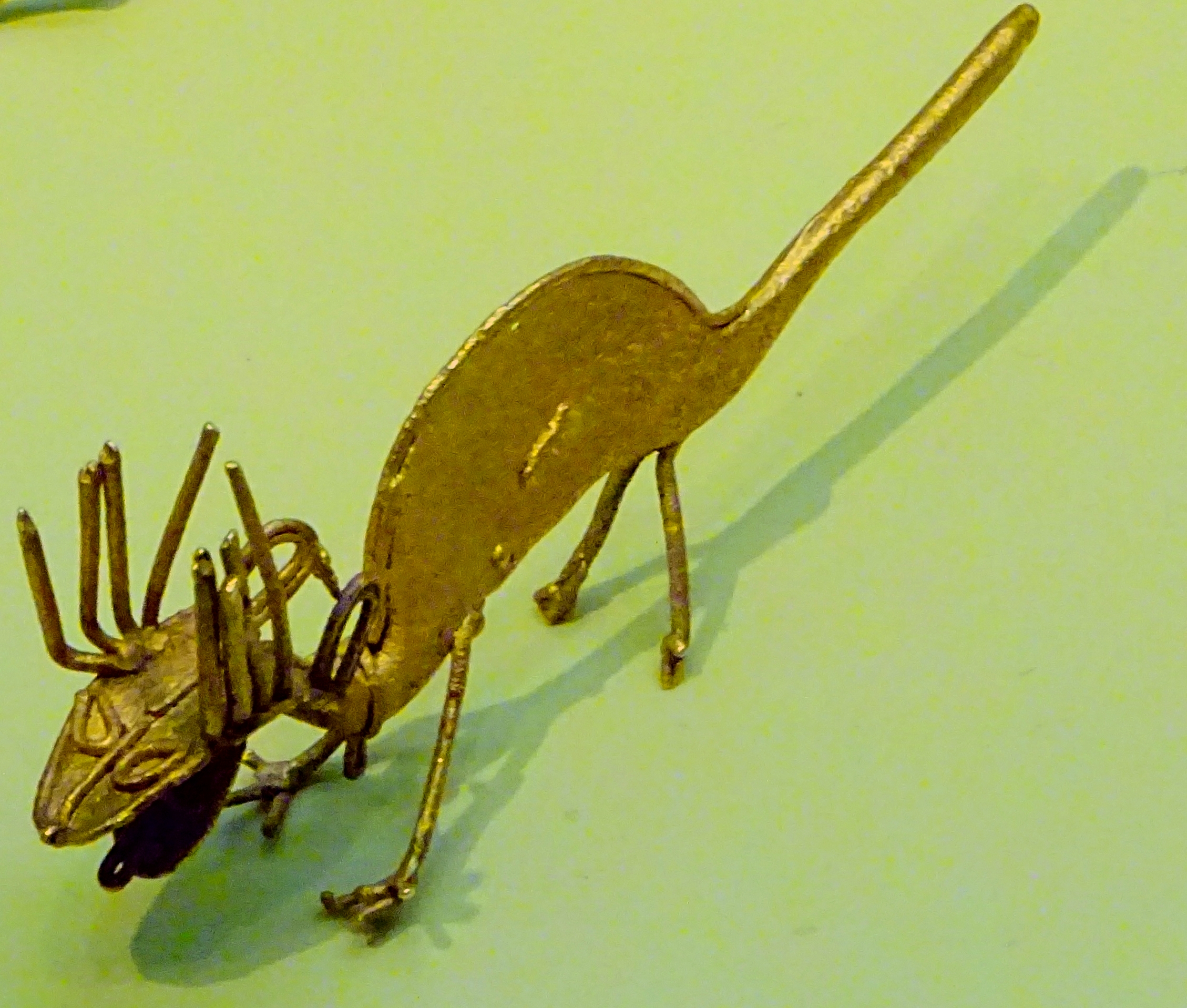
Zoomorph tunjo in the Museo del Oro

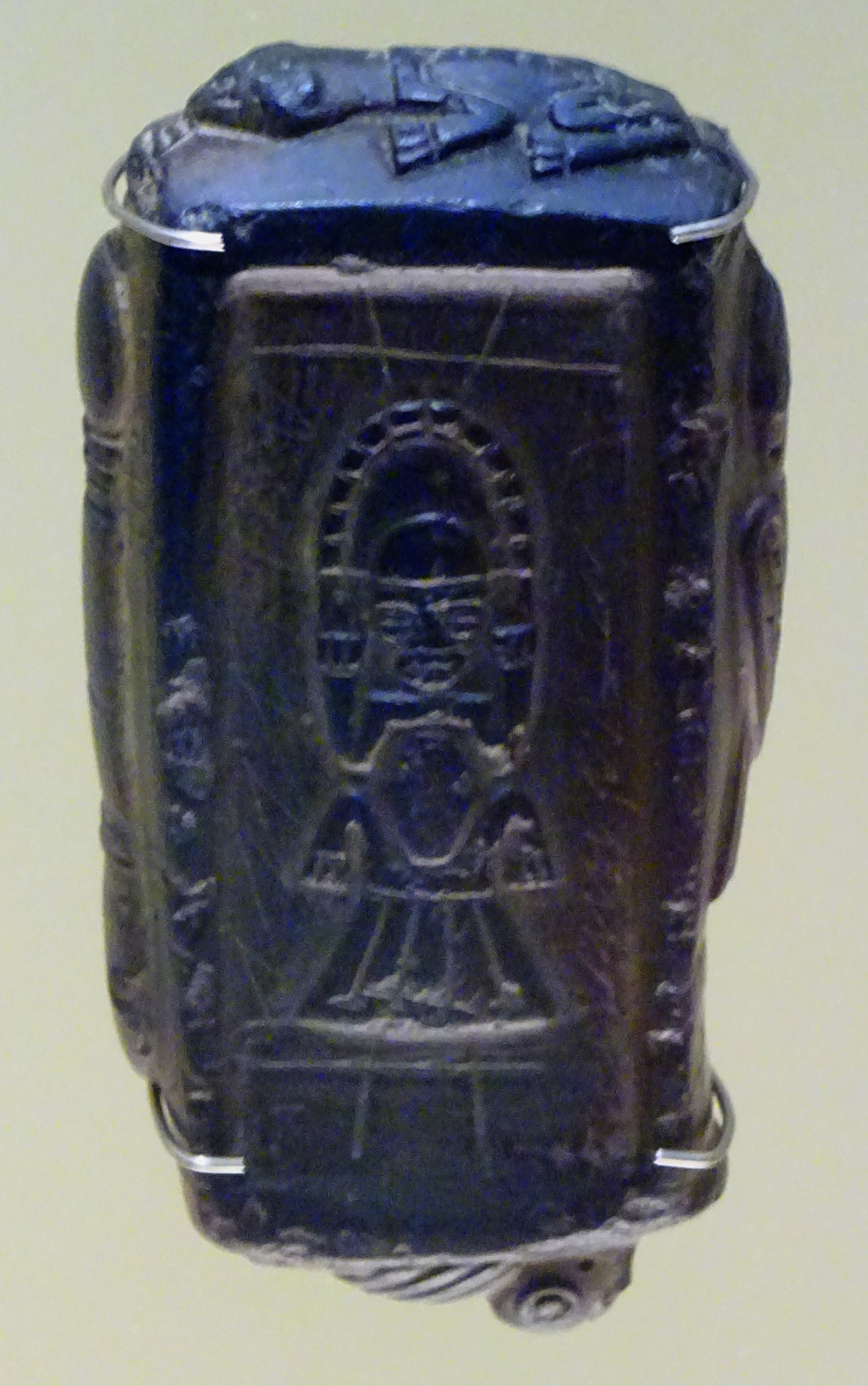
Tunjo mold in the Museo del Oro

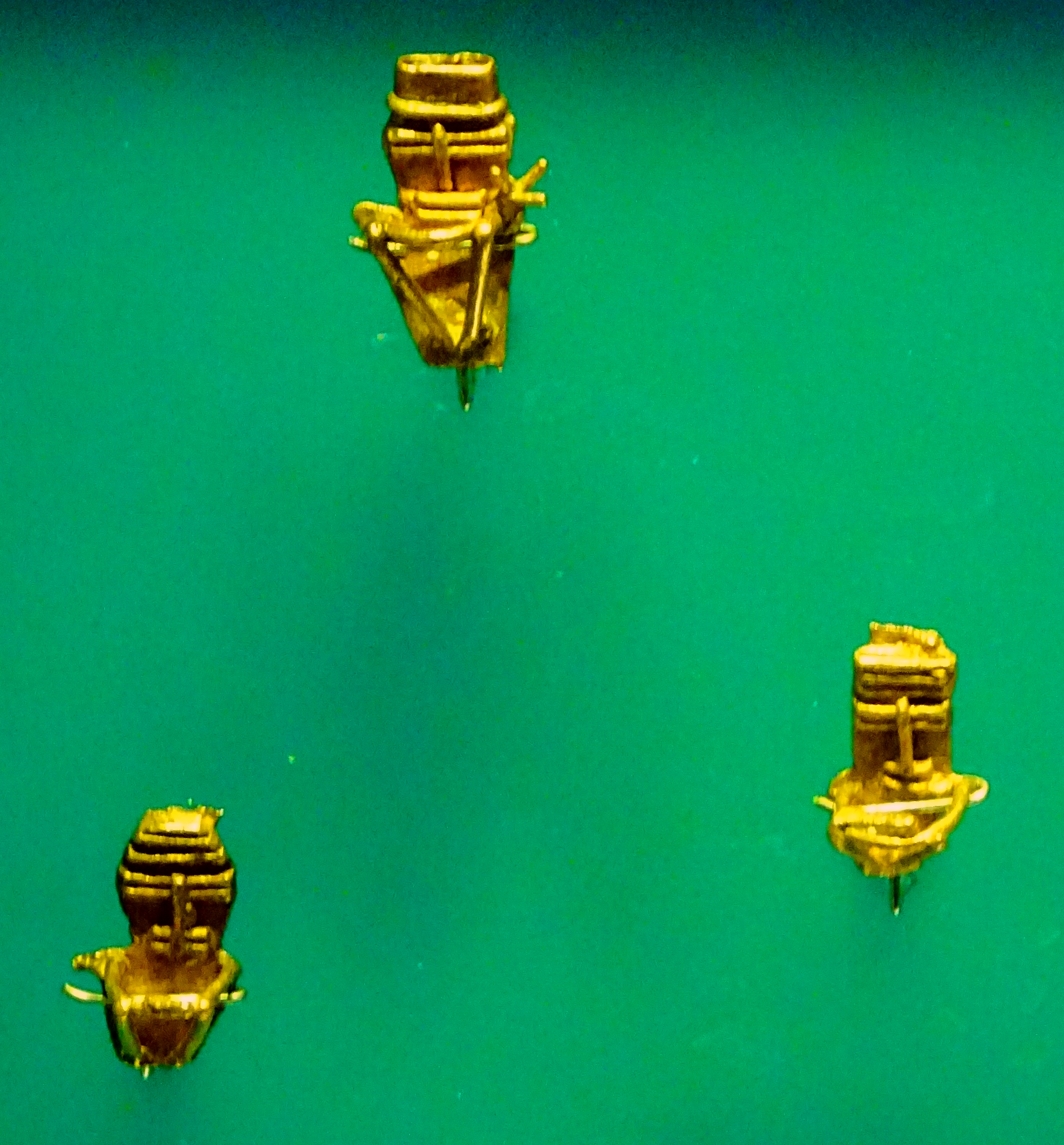
Tunjos of tumbaga in the Museo del Oro

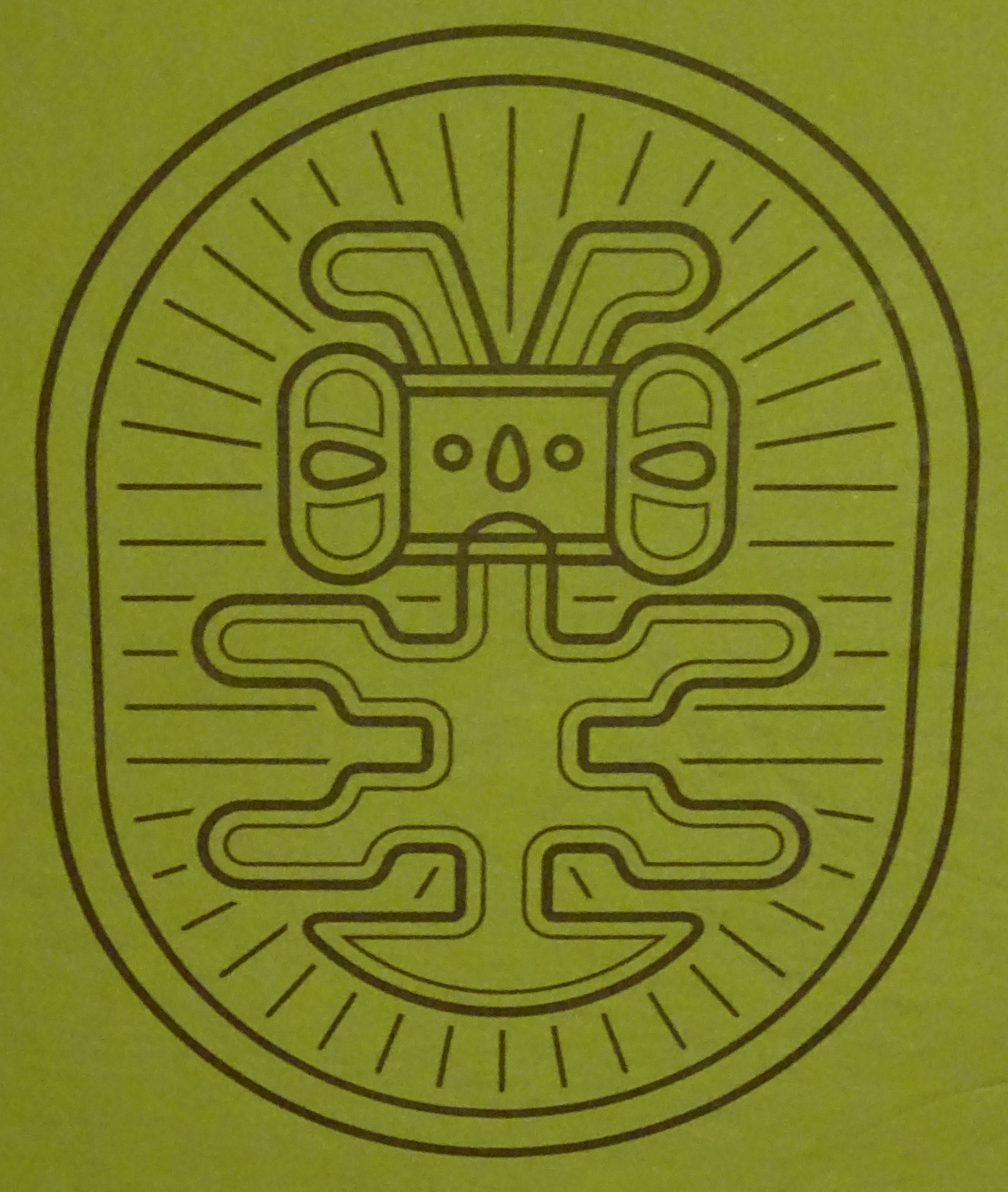
Tunjo symbol of Club Colombia beer

A tunjo (from Muysccubun: chunso) is a small anthropomorphic or zoomorphic figure elaborated by the Muisca as part of their art. Tunjos were made of gold or tumbaga; a gold-silver-copper alloy. The Muisca used their tunjos in various instances in their religion and the small votive offering figures have been found in various places on the Altiplano Cundiboyacense, Colombia. Tunjos were used as offer pieces, to communicate with the gods and when the Muisca asked for favours from their deities. Muisca scholar Pedro Simón wrote about the tunjos of the Muisca.

== Background ==
The Muisca, organised in their loose Muisca Confederation, exhibited one of the four advanced civilizations of the pre-Columbian Americas. While the Aztec, the Maya and the Inca were famous for their grand architecture with temples, pyramids and cities, the Muisca lived in simple wooden and reed bohíos. The main skill of the Muisca was their goldworking. The Muisca made pectoral pieces, nose rings (narigueras), earrings, plates, poporos and other figures from the gold they traded with the surrounding indigenous groups, such as the Muzo, Panche, Guane, Pijao and others. One of the most common finds of these gold or tumbaga figures are the tunjos.

== Description ==
Tunjos were small figures picturing people, the deities of the Muisca religion or animals. They were used for three purposes; as ornaments in the graves of the Muisca people, from various social classes, as decoration at the entrances of temples and shrines, which once filled were buried in secret places by the Muisca priests and as offer ritual figures in the sacred lakes and rivers of the Muisca.

Tunjos have been uncovered in Lake Guatavita, Bosa River; the part of the Bogotá River west of the Bogotá neighbourhood Bosa, and in various other sacred sites of the Muisca. Tunjos have been found in caves too. In 2001, a farmer found three tunjos in Carmen de Carupa, Cundinamarca. Exactly the same figures have been found up to the Valle del Cauca in the south of Colombia. The Pijao also made tunjos.

=== Fabrication ===
The Muisca used to make matrixes or moulds of rock types such as shales and obsidian and poured their molten gold or tumbaga into the matrix. When the metals were cooled and solidified, they removed the stone moulds and the tunjos remained. To create the 2D tunjos, they used a lost-wax casting process using beeswax to make the figure, put the wax tunjo in clay, that was heated to evaporate the wax and the gold or tumbaga was poured into the empty space left.

The design of the majority of tunjos appears to have gold wire soldered or brazed onto their surface. This, however, is not the case and analysis of the dendrites formed in the metal has shown that they have in fact been cast as one piece.

==== Alloys ====
Various tunjos have been analysed with X-ray fluorescence (XRF) giving the following results:

metal	1	2	3	4	5	6	7	8	#2	#8
gold	71.54	79.48	96.90	88.64	88.72	81.10	86.72	85.62	54.63	45.91
silver	23.67	18.01	2.48	11.05	10.02	12.18	12.79	12.79	16.31	10.55
copper	4.62	2.48	traces	0.12	1.11	5.94	1.16	1.47	29.31	43.70
lead	traces					0.28	traces			
iron					0.02					

=== Museum collections ===
Of the relatively few Muisca artefacts that can be found in museums outside of Colombia, the tunjos are most common. Tunjos are in the collections of the American Museum of Natural History, Art Institute of Chicago, Baltimore Museum of Art, British Museum, Brooklyn Museum, Cleveland Museum of Art, Dallas Museum of Art, Hunt Museum (listed as "possible Peruvian" [sic]), Metropolitan Museum of Art, Museum of Fine Arts, Houston, Princeton University Art Museum, Smithsonian National Museum of the American Indian.

== Trivia ==
- the largest Colombian beer brand Club Colombia uses a tunjo in their symbolism.

== Gallery ==
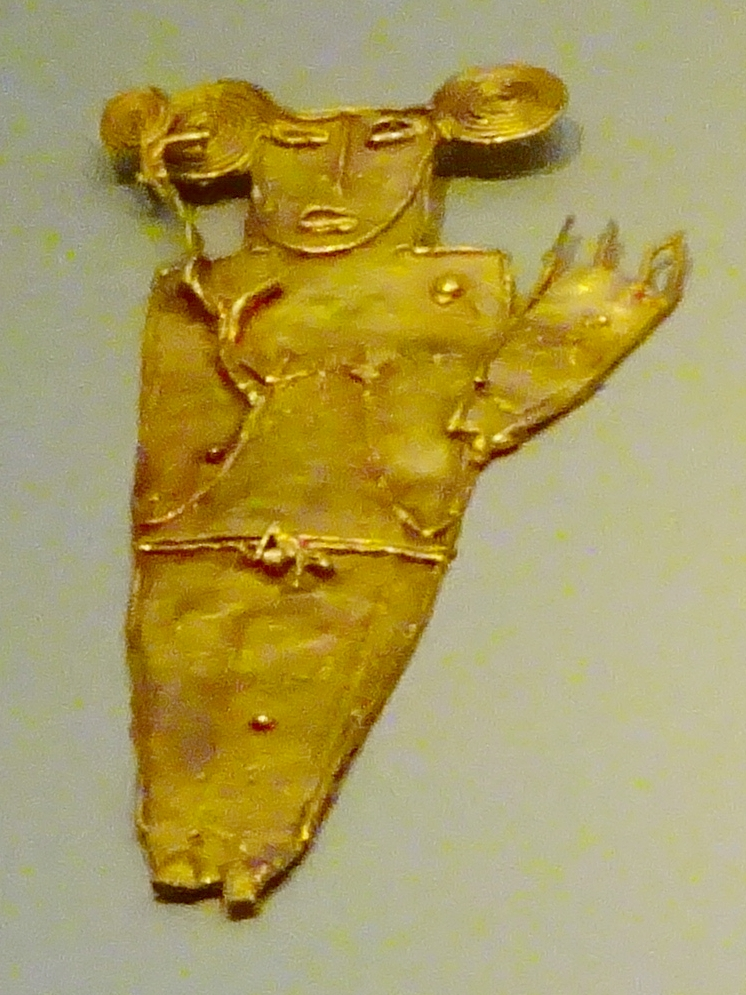
Tunjo, Museo del Oro, Bogotá

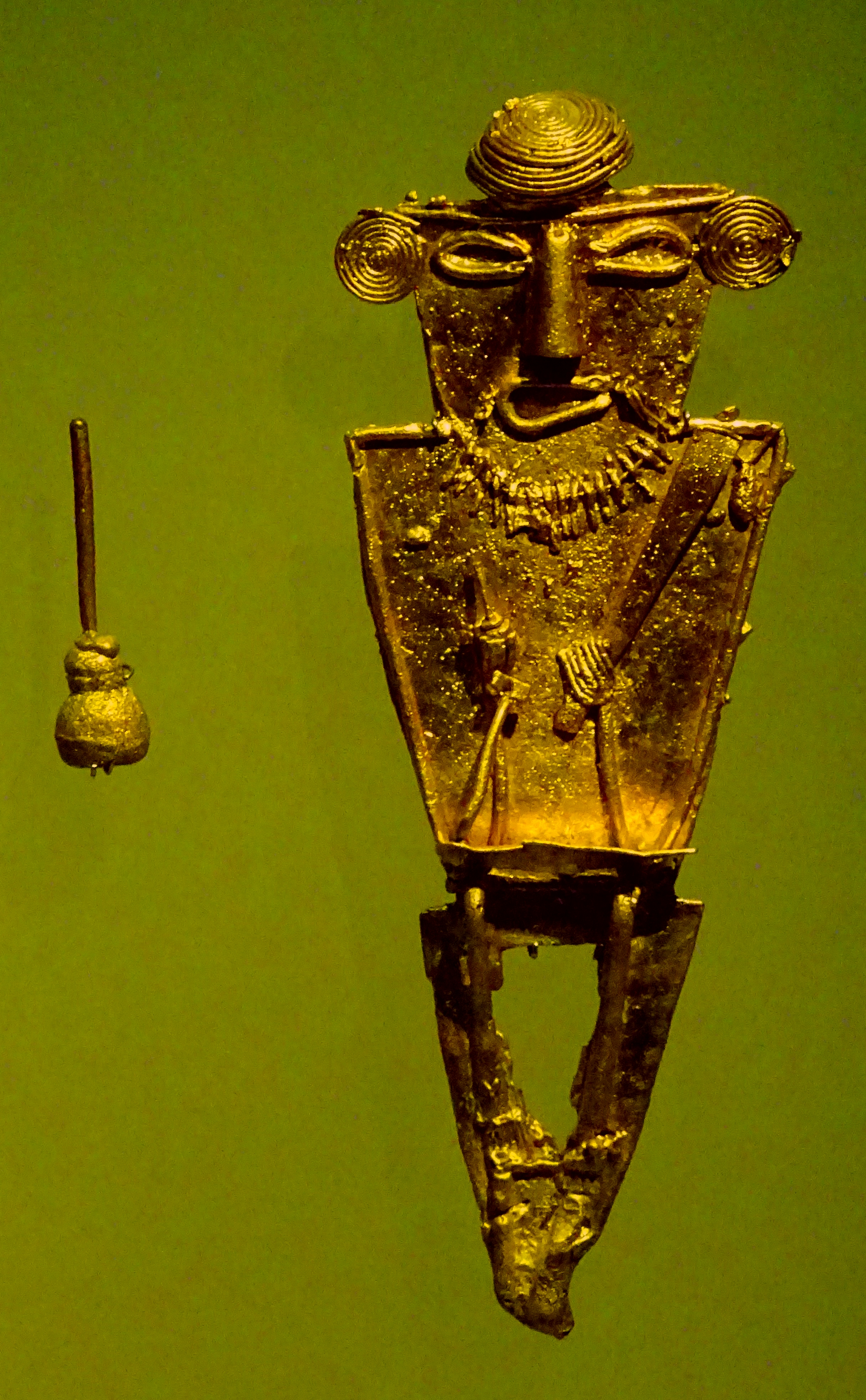
Tunjo, Museo del Oro

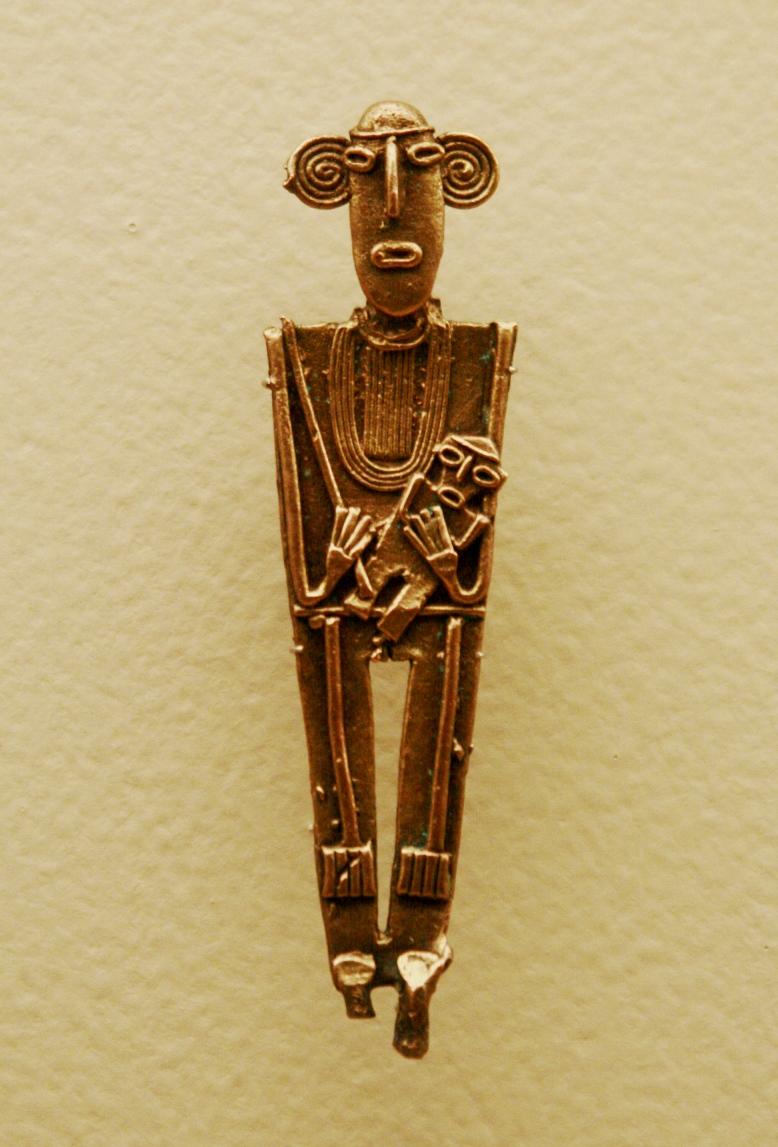
Tunjo, Museo del Oro

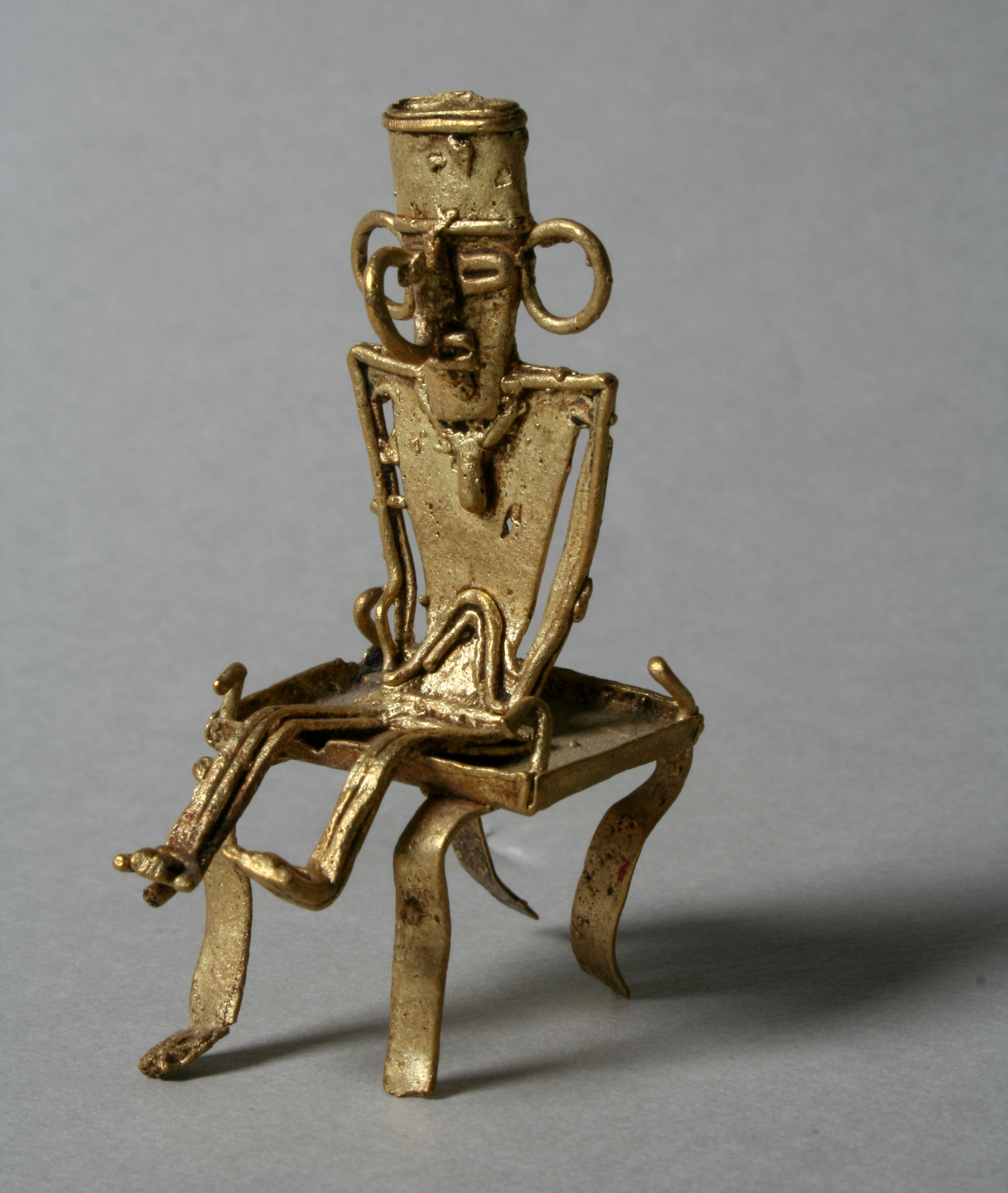
Tunjo on stool, MET, NYC

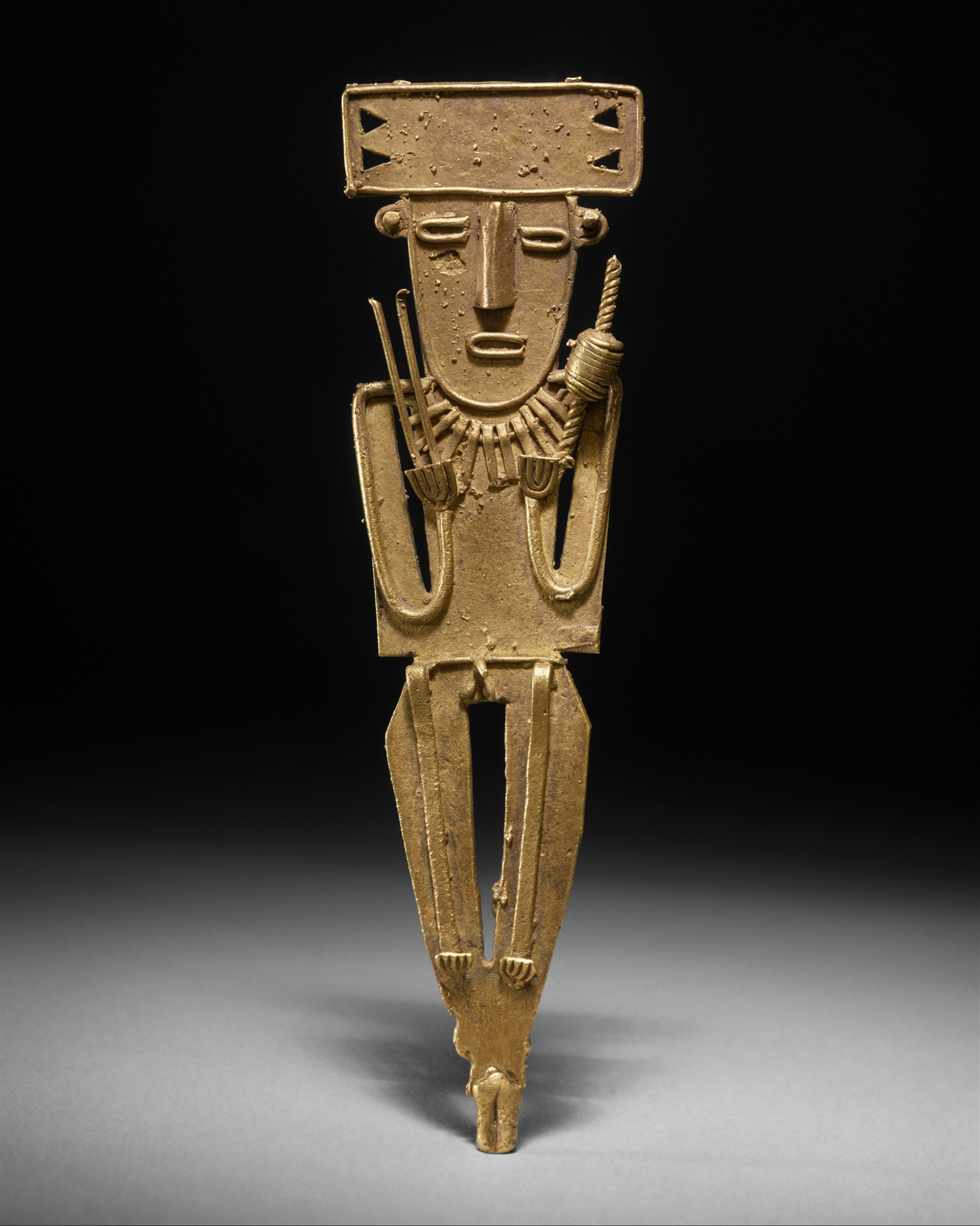
Tunjo, MET

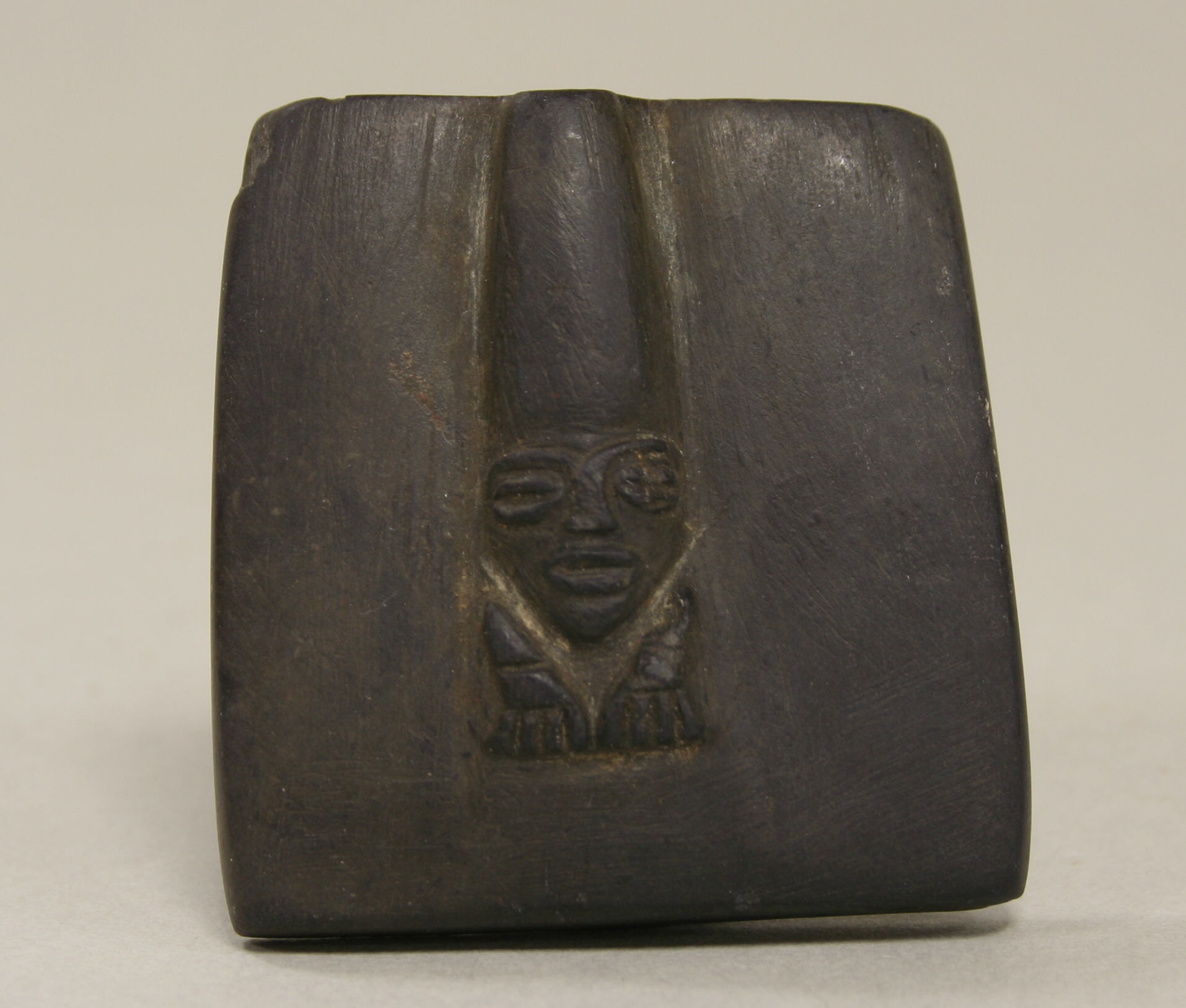
Mold for tunjo production, MET

== See also ==
- Muisca art
- Muisca economy
- Gold Museum, Bogotá, the largest collection of tunjos and other indigenous Colombian golden art
- Muisca religion
- Los Tunjos Lake, a lake in the Sumapaz Paramo, named after the tunjos
- Muisca
