= Pedagogical and Technological University of Colombia =

Public university in Colombia

Coordinates: 5°33′16″N 73°21′09″W

- Universidad Pedagógica y Tecnológica de Colombia
- Motto: Futurum Ædificamus
- Type: Public university
- Established: October 10, 1953
- Rector: Gustavo Orlando Álvarez Álvarez
- Students: 28,000
- Location: Tunja, Sogamoso, Duitama, Chiquinquirá, Boyacá, Colombia
- Campus: Avenida Central del Norte 150003, Tunja
- Nickname: "La Uptc"
- Website: uptc.edu.co

The Pedagogical and Technological University of Colombia (Spanish: Universidad Pedagógica y Tecnológica de Colombia), also known as "La UPTC", is a national public university in Colombia with main campus in Tunja and presence in the country's seven departments.

The university has a headquarters, three sectional branches, six sites for extension programs and 21 regional centers for distance learning in which there are 11 faculties, 52 undergraduate academic programs, 15 undergraduate academic distance programs and 23 postgraduate programs. It is an educational, scientific and technological university, currently ranked number 7 among the best 64 universities in Colombia (2012) according to a study by Research Sapiens Group research sapiens that built a ranking, which was titled "U-Sapiens Ranking Colombia" where are cataloged 64 universities of the country.

== Campus ==
The most important branches of the Uptc are located in the main cities in Boyacá.

=== Principal ===
Headquarters - Some landmarks in the campus are the Jorge Palacios Preciado Library, Central Building, Camilo Torres Restrepo square, the university city and the Escuela Normal Superior Santiago de Tunja.

Avenida Central del Norte, 150003 Tunja

- Health Faculty

Hospital Antiguo San Rafael Tunja

=== Branches ===
- Sogamoso Faculty

Calle 4 Sur 15-134. 152211, Sogamoso

- Duitama Faculty

Carrera 18 23-55. 150461, Duitama

- Chiquinquirá Faculty

Calle 14A 2-36. 154640, Chiquinquirá

- Bogotá Faculty

Carrera 14 44-51. 110311, Bogotá D.C.

=== Extension Program Centers ===
- DC
- Boyacá: Garagoa, Puerto Boyacá, Soatá, chiquinquirá
- Casanare: Yopal, Aguazul

=== Distance Education Regional Centers ===
- Amazonas: Leticia
- Bogotá
- Boyacá: Chiquinquirá, Chiscas, Duitama, Garagoa, Muzo, Puerto Boyacá, Samacá, Soatá, Sogamoso
- Casanare: Monterrey, Yopal
- Cundinamarca: Cogua, Fusagasugá, Gachetá, La Palma, Quetame
- Meta: Acacías
- Santander: Barbosa, Barrancabermeja

== See also ==
- List of universities in Colombia
- List of Muisca research institutes
