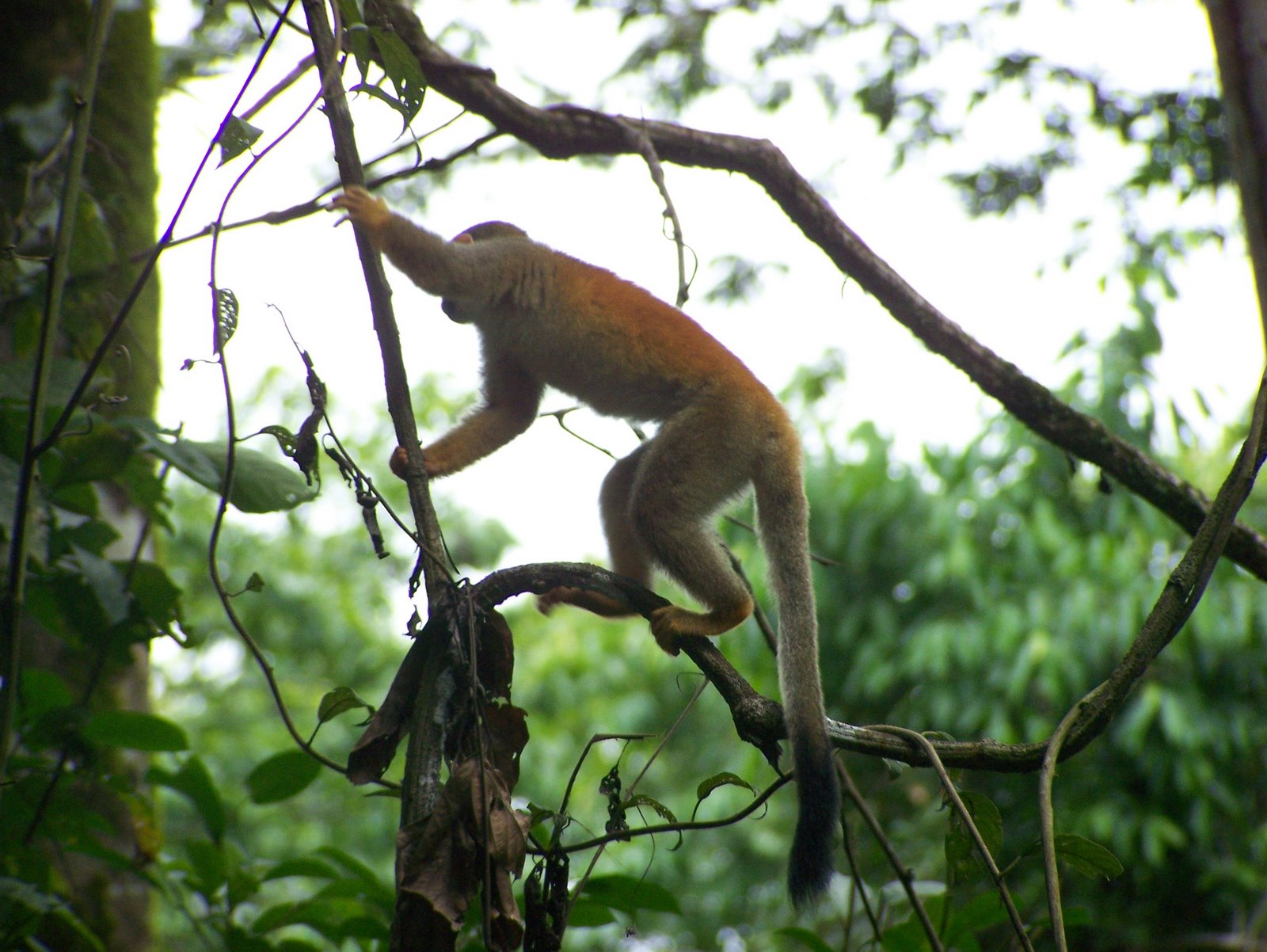

Conservation status
- Endangered (IUCN 3.1)

Scientific classification
- Kingdom: Animalia
- Phylum: Chordata
- Class: Mammalia
- Order: Primates
- Family: Cebidae
- Genus: Saimiri
- Species: S. oerstedii
- Subspecies: S. o. citrinellus

Trinomial name
- Saimiri oerstedii citrinellus Thomas, 1904
- S. o. citrinellus range shown in red

= Grey-crowned Central American squirrel monkey =

Subspecies of New World monkey

The grey-crowned Central American squirrel monkey (Saimiri oerstedii citrinellus) is a subspecies of the Central American squirrel monkey. Its range is restricted to the Pacific coast of central Costa Rica. The northern end of its range is the Rio Tulin and the southern end of its range is the Rio Grande de Terraba. South of the Rio Grande de Terraba, it is replaced by the black-crowned Central American squirrel monkey, S. oerstedii oerstedii. Populations are very fragmented, and the subspecies does not occur in all locations within its general range. It is the subspecies of Central American squirrel monkey seen in Manuel Antonio National Park in Costa Rica.

The grey-crowned Central American squirrel monkey is orange or reddish-orange in color, with a black cap. It differs from the black-crowned Central American squirrel monkey in that the limbs and underparts of the grey-crowned Central American squirrel monkey are less yellowish. Some authorities also consider the cap on the grey-crowned Central American squirrel monkey to be less black than that of the black-crowned Central American squirrel monkey, but other authorities regard this as a feature that varies by age rather than by subspecies.

Adults reach a length of between 266 and 291 millimetres (10.5 and 11.5 in), excluding tail, and a weight between 600 and 950 grams (21 and 34 oz). The tail is longer than the body, and between 362 and 389 mm (14.3 and 15.3 in) in length. Males have an average body weight of 829 g (29.2 oz) and females have an average body weight of 695 g (24.5 oz).

The grey-crowned Central American squirrel monkey is arboreal and diurnal. It lives in groups containing several adult males, several adult females and juveniles. It is omnivorous, with a diet that includes insects and insect larvae (especially grasshoppers and caterpillars), spiders, fruit, leaves, bark, flowers and nectar. It also eats small vertebrates, including bats, birds, lizards and frogs. It finds its food foraging through the lower and middle levels of the forest.

The grey-crowned Central American squirrel monkey was assessed by the International Union for Conservation of Nature (IUCN) as Endangered. This was an improvement from prior assessments, in which the subspecies was assessed as "critically endangered". It is listed as endangered to a small and severely fragmented range amounting to only about 3,500 square kilometers (1,400 sq mi), and continuing habitat loss. There are conservation efforts within Costa Rica to try to preserve this monkey from extinction.
