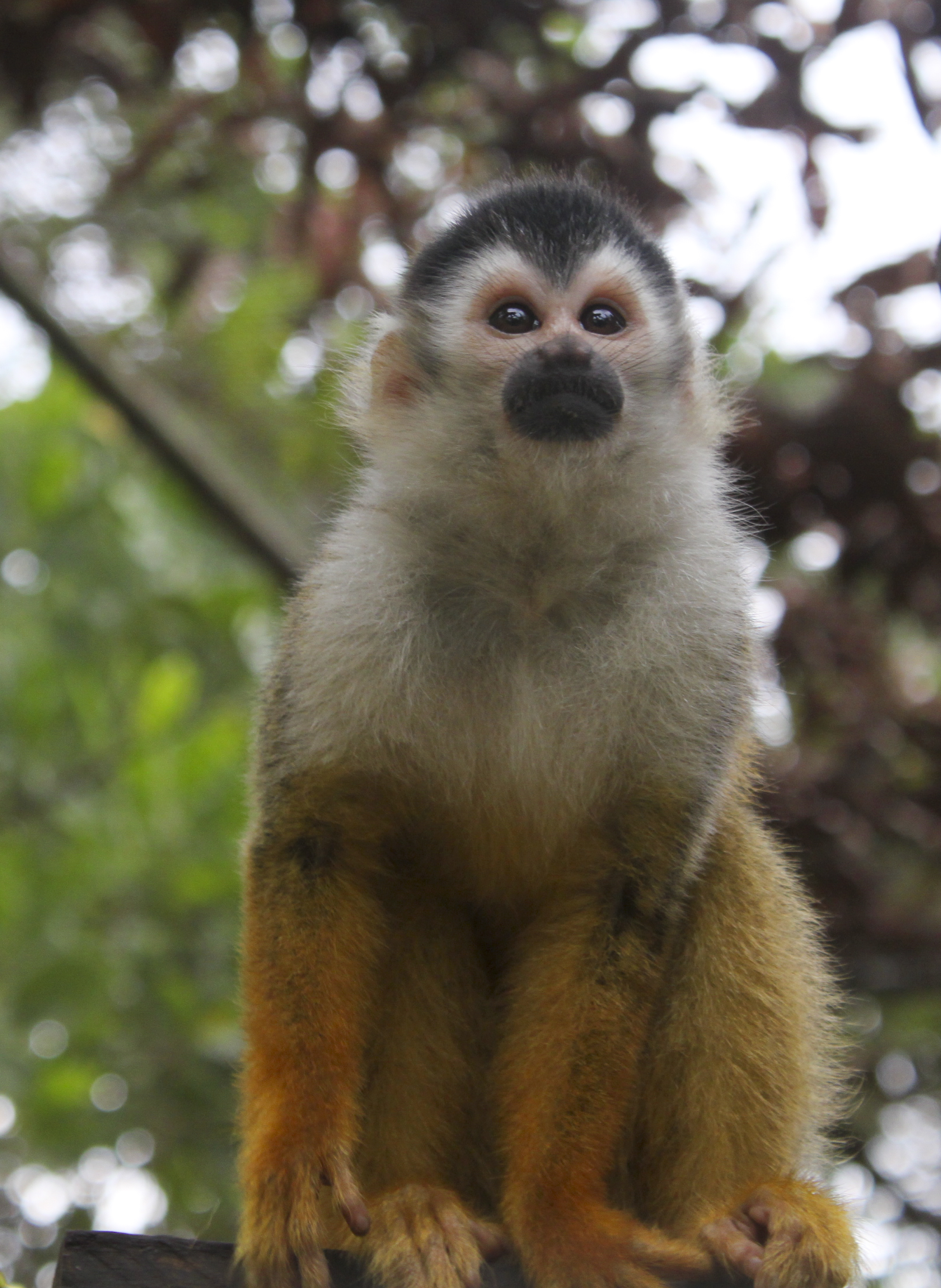

Conservation status
- Endangered (IUCN 3.1)

Scientific classification
- Kingdom: Animalia
- Phylum: Chordata
- Class: Mammalia
- Infraclass: Placentalia
- Order: Primates
- Family: Cebidae
- Genus: Saimiri
- Species: S. oerstedii
- Subspecies: S. o. oerstedii

Trinomial name
- Saimiri oerstedii oerstedii Reinhardt, 1872
- S. o. oerstedii range shown in blue

= Black-crowned Central American squirrel monkey =

Subspecies of New World monkey

The black-crowned Central American squirrel monkey (Saimiri oerstedii oerstedii) is a subspecies of the Central American squirrel monkey. Its range is restricted to the Pacific coast of western Panama to the western portion of the Chiriquí Province and of southern Costa Rica, south of the Rio Grande de Terraba, including the Osa Peninsula. It is the subspecies of Central American squirrel monkey seen in Corcovado National Park in Costa Rica. Its type locality is David, Panama, but its range apparently no longer extends that far east.

The black-crowned Central American squirrel monkey is orange or reddish-orange in color, with a black cap. It differs from the grey-crowned Central American squirrel monkey, which replaces it in central Costa Rica, in that the limbs and underparts of the black-crowned Central American squirrel monkey are more yellowish. Some authorities also consider the cap on the black-crowned Central American squirrel monkey to be more black than that of the grey-crowned Central American squirrel monkey (C. o. citrinellus), but other authorities regard this as a feature that varies by age rather than by subspecies.

Adults reach a length of between 266 and 291 millimetres (10.5 and 11.5 in), excluding tail, and a weight between 600 and 950 grams (21 and 34 oz). The tail is longer than the body, and between 362 and 389 mm (14.3 and 15.3 in) in length. Males have an average body weight of 829 g (29.2 oz) and females have an average body weight of 695 g (24.5 oz).

The black-crowned Central American squirrel monkey is arboreal and diurnal. It lives in groups containing several adult males, several adult females and juveniles. It is omnivorous, with a diet that includes insects and insect larvae (especially grasshoppers and caterpillars), spiders, fruit, leaves, bark, flowers and nectar. It also eats small vertebrates, including bats, birds, lizards and frogs. It finds its food foraging through the lower and middle levels of the forest, typically between fifteen and thirty feet high.

The black-crowned Central American squirrel monkey is one of the few squirrel monkey taxa that has been the subject of a long-term study. Primatologist Sue Boinski has made several long-term studies of the subspecies.

The black-crowned Central American squirrel monkey was assessed by the International Union for Conservation of Nature (IUCN) as Endangered. This was consistent with prior assessments. It is listed as endangered to a small and fragmented range amounting to only about 4,000 square kilometers (1,500 sq mi), and continuing habitat loss. A reforestation project within Panama tries to preserve the vanishing population of the Chiriquí Province.
