= List of Costa Rican monkey species =

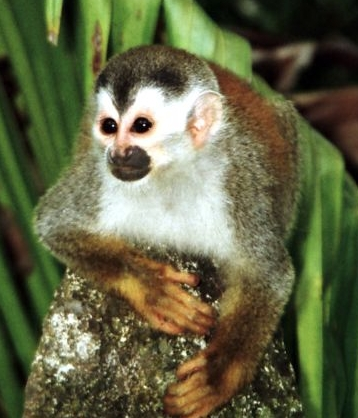
Central American squirrel monkey, Saimiri oerstedii, smallest of the Costa Rican monkey species

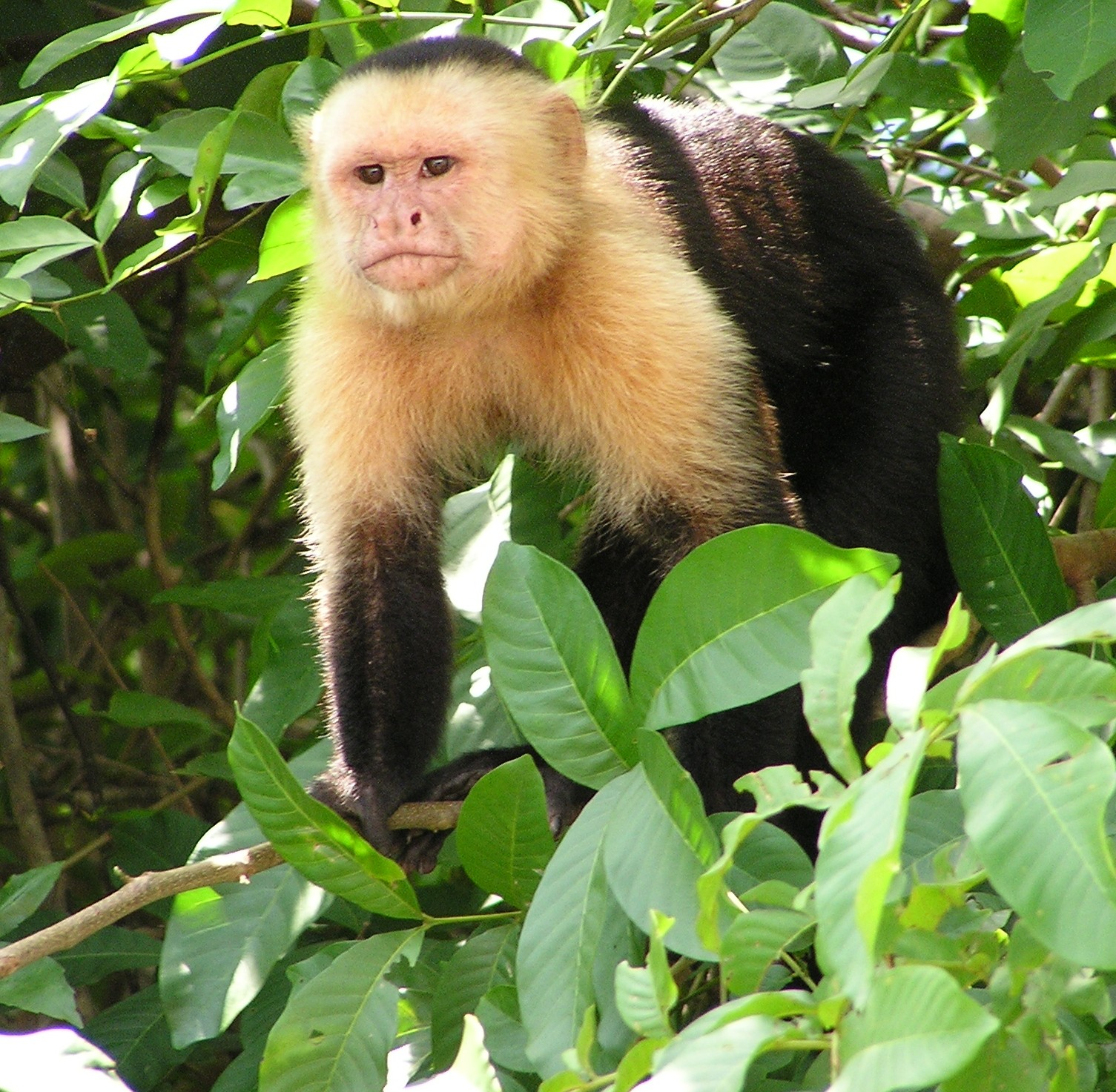
Panamanian white-faced capuchin (Cebus imitator)

Four species of monkey are native to the forests of Costa Rica, the Central American squirrel monkey (Saimiri oerstedii), the Panamanian white-faced capuchin (Cebus imitator), the mantled howler (Alouatta palliata) and Geoffroy's spider monkey (Ateles geoffroyi). All four species are classified scientifically as New World Monkeys. Two of the species, the Central American squirrel monkey and the white-faced capuchin, belong to the family Cebidae, the family containing the squirrel monkeys and capuchins. The other two species belong to the family Atelidae, the family containing the howler monkeys, spider monkeys, woolly monkeys and muriquis. Each of the four species can be seen in national parks within Costa Rica, where viewing them in natural surroundings is a popular tourist attraction. A place where all four species can be seen is Corcovado National Park, on the Osa Peninsula.

The smallest of the Costa Rican monkey species is the Central American squirrel monkey. Adult males average 0.8 kg (1.8 lb) and adult females average 0.7 kg (1.5 lb). The Central American squirrel monkey has the most restricted range of any Costa Rican monkey, living only in secondary forests and partially logged primary forests on the central and south Pacific coast of Costa Rica, and on the Pacific coast of Panama near the Costa Rican border. In 2008, the International Union for Conservation of Nature (IUCN) revised its conservation status to "vulnerable" after rating it "endangered" since 1982. The Central American squirrel monkey is most often seen in Manuel Antonio National Park and Corcovado National Park in Costa Rica.

The other three species have wider ranges within Costa Rica, each being found in forests over much of the country. The white-faced capuchin, which has a range from Honduras to Ecuador, is the second smallest Costa Rican monkey. Adult males average 3.7 kg (8.2 lb) and adult females average 2.7 kg (6.0 lb). The mantled howler, with a range from Mexico to Ecuador, is the second largest monkey species in Costa Rica. Adult males average 7.2 kg (16 lb) and adult females average 5.4 kg (12 lb). Males make loud calls, especially at dawn and at dusk, that can be heard for several kilometers. Geoffroy's spider monkey, with a range from Mexico to Panama, is the largest of the Costa Rican monkeys, with males averaging 8.2 kg (18 lb) and females averaging 7.7 kg (17 lb). It has long, slim arms and a long, prehensile tail. The IUCN has rated the white-faced capuchin and mantled howler in the lowest conservation risk category of "least concern", and has rated Geoffroy's spider monkey as "endangered". Both the white-faced capuchin and the mantled howler are commonly seen in Costa Rica's parks.

It is unknown why the Central American squirrel monkey has such a restricted range relative to the other Costa Rican monkey species. One theory is that the Central American squirrel monkey's ancestors arrived in Central America earlier than the ancestors of the other species. Under this theory, the squirrel monkey's ancestors arrived in Central America between 3 and 3.5 million years ago, but could not compete effectively when the ancestors of the other species arrived in Central America about 2 million years ago. The other species thus drove the squirrel monkey out of most of its original range. Another factor may be the Central American squirrel monkey's preference for lowland, coastal areas, which may make them more vulnerable to significant population declines due to occasional major hurricanes.

Two other monkey species are sometimes reported as living in Costa Rica, Geoffroy's tamarin (Saguinus geoffroyi) and the Panamanian night monkey (Aotus zonalis or Aotus lemurinus zonalis). The western edge of Geoffroy's tamarin's known range is just west of the Panama Canal zone, about 200 kilometres (120 mi) from the Costa Rica border, and thus reports of it living in Costa Rica are most likely erroneous. Confusion may have resulted from the fact that over part of its range Geoffroy's tamarin is locally referred to as mono titi, which is a name also used for the Central American squirrel monkey in Costa Rica. Reports of the Panamanian night monkey living in Costa Rica are plausible, since the species is known to occur on the Caribbean coast of Panama not far from the Costa Rica border. However, reports of it living in Costa Rica have not been confirmed by scientists.

== Key ==
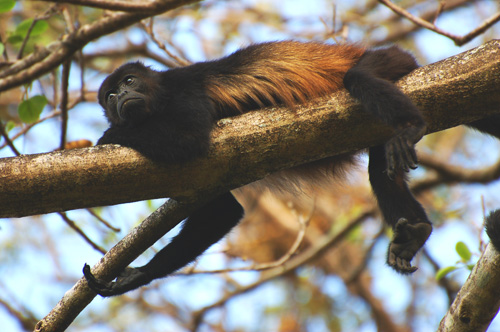
Female mantled howler (Alouatta palliata)

Common Name	Common name of the species, per Wilson, et al. Mammal Species of the World (2005)
Scientific Name	Scientific name of the species
Family	Family within New World monkeys to which the species belongs
Average Size – Male	Average size of adult male members of the species, in kilograms and pounds, per Campbell, et al. Primates in Perspective (2007)
Average Size – Female	Average size of adult female members of the species, in kilograms and pounds, per Campbell, et al. Primates in Perspective (2007)
Conservation Status	Conservation status of the species, per IUCN as of 2008
Range	Countries in which the species occurs;

== Costa Rican monkey species ==
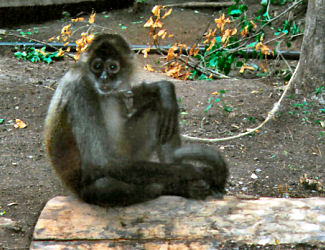
Geoffroy's spider monkey (Ateles geoffroyi)

Common name	Scientific name	Family	Average Size – Male	Average Size – Female	Conservation Status	Range	References
Central American squirrel monkey	Saimiri oerstedii	Cebidae	0.829 kg (1.83 lb)	0.695 kg (1.53 lb)	Endangered	Costa Rica, Panama	
Panamanian white-faced capuchin	Cebus imitator	Cebidae	3.668 kg (8.09 lb)	2.666 kg (5.88 lb)	Vulnerable	Honduras through Ecuador	
Mantled howler	Alouatta palliata	Atelidae	7.150 kg (15.76 lb)	5.350 kg (11.79 lb)	Vulnerable	Mexico through Ecuador	
Geoffroy's spider monkey	Ateles geoffroyi	Atelidae	8.210 kg (18.10 lb)	7.700 kg (16.98 lb)	Endangered	Mexico through Panama	
