= The Sloth Institute Costa Rica =

The Sloth Institute
- "Save a Sloth • Save a Tree • Save a Forest"
- Abbreviation: TSI
- Established: 2014; 12 years ago
- Founders: Seda Sejud & Sam Trull
- Type: NGO
- Purpose: The Sloth Institute (TSI)’s mission is to enhance and expand the welfare and conservation of sloths.
- Headquarters: Quepos, Puntarenas Province
- Region served: Costa Rica
- Executive Director: Sam Trull
- Website: www.theslothinstitute.org

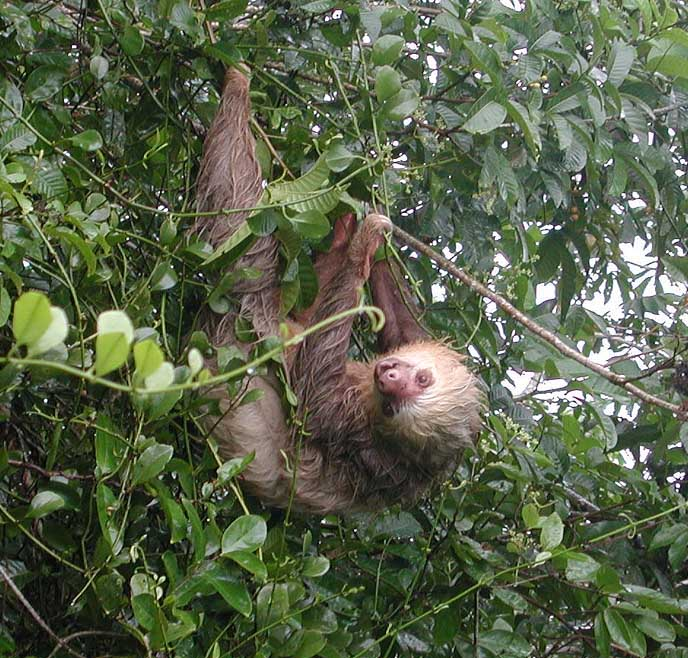
A two-toed (Hoffmann's) sloth

The Sloth Institute Costa Rica is a small, not-for-profit organization based in Manuel Antonio, close to Manuel Antonio National Park, Costa Rica, dedicated to the rescue and rehabilitation of sloths. It often takes in orphaned or injured sloths, which require care. Through the work of the team, the sloths are rehabilitated and released back into the wild.

== Mission ==
The Sloth Institute's mission is to enhance and expand the welfare and conservation of sloths.

They achieve this by taking a multifaceted 4-part approach to tackling the issues that put sloths in danger:

- RESCUE, REHABILITATE and RELEASE orphaned and injured sloths.
- RESEARCH of captive, wild, and recently released sloths including collaborations with conservationists and scientists around the world.
- EDUCATION to generate and disseminate responsible information about sloths to the general public and train local public servants on proper sloth information and rescue techniques.
- CONSERVATION programs that negate human encroachment issues impacting sloth’s welfare and habitat.

The Sloth Institute is not a sloth sanctuary. TSI is a non-profit organization specializing in rescue, research and education with a particular focus on the behavior, health, and welfare of released, wild and captive sloths. Their sloths are not available to be seen by the public as it is in their best interest to have as little human contact as possible.

== Partnerships ==
The Sloth Institute Partners with several other agencies to rehabilitate, release and research sloths. They also use these agencies to reach more people in educating the public.

They work with Tulemar Resort Hotel, a resort placed in a jungle and adjacent to the maritime zone. This partnership allows the Sloth Institute to release orphaned and hand-raised sloths into the jungle and maritime zone. In addition Tulemar offers sloth walks that are meant to educate guests in a safe way. These walks are specifically for educating their guests and are not intended for interaction with the sloths because they are better off with less human contact....

The Institute also works with the Cincinnati Zoo and Botanical Garden to help with the study of and rehabilitation to release of sloths. This partnership came about in 2014 and is working in the Manuel Antonio area of Costa Rica.

== Projects ==
As part of the institute's goals of research and rehabilitation, they have a number of projects. The Sloth Speedways and Tracking programs are two of these projects.

Sloth Speedways' goal is to prevent dangerous travel from sloths across roads by keeping forests connected through strategically placed rope bridges. This project stems from the deforestation and building on previous forest space which can reduce a sloth's connections to food and shelter.

The Tracking program is the first sloth institute program, from 2015, and focuses on watching the recently released sloths to ensure their survival and health. In addition to tracking their rehabilitated and released sloths they also put tracking collars on wild sloths. This allows the program to determine if rehabilitated sloths are behaving like normal sloths would.

The data from the Tracking program allows the Institute to place these sloth speedways in commonly traveled and potentially hazardous areas for the sloths.

== History ==
The Sloth Institute Costa Rica was founded in 2014 by co-founders Seda Sejud and Sam Trull who is also known as "the Mother of Sloths".

It is also believed that the Sloth Institute delivered the world's first birth of a sloth by Caesarean section.
