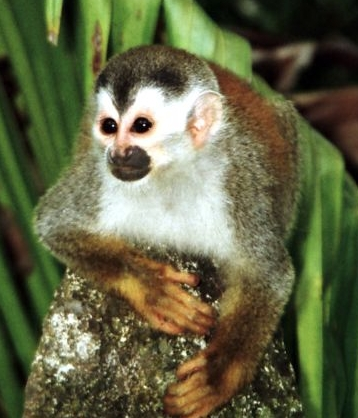

Conservation status
- Endangered (IUCN 3.1)
- CITES Appendix I

Scientific classification
- Kingdom: Animalia
- Phylum: Chordata
- Class: Mammalia
- Order: Primates
- Family: Cebidae
- Genus: Saimiri
- Species: S. oerstedii

Binomial name
- Saimiri oerstedii Reinhardt, 1872
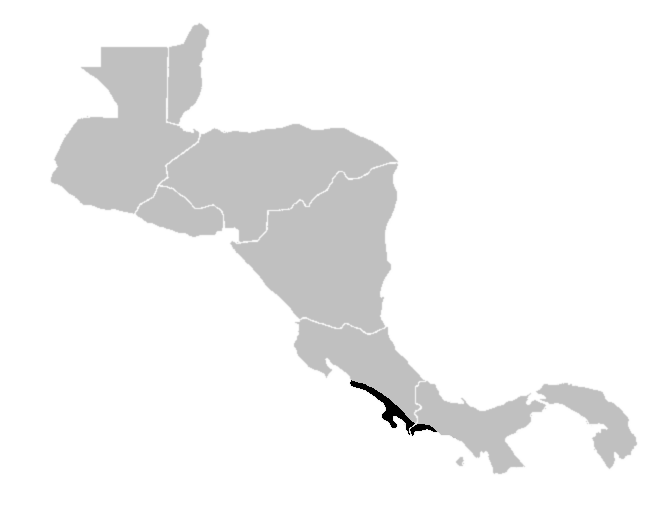
- Distribution of Saimiri oerstedii

= Central American squirrel monkey =

Species of New World monkey

The Central American squirrel monkey (Saimiri oerstedii), also known as the red-backed squirrel monkey, is a squirrel monkey species from the Pacific coast of Costa Rica and Panama. It is restricted to the northwestern tip of Panama near the border with Costa Rica, and the central and southern Pacific coast of Costa Rica, primarily in Manuel Antonio and Corcovado National Parks.

It is a small monkey with an orange back and a distinctive white and black facial mask. It has an omnivorous diet, eating fruits, other plant materials, invertebrates and some small vertebrates. In turn, it has a number of predators, including raptors, cats and snakes. It lives in large groups that typically contain between 20 and 75 monkeys. It has one of the most egalitarian social structures of all monkeys. Females do not form dominance hierarchies, and males do so only at breeding season. Females become sexually mature at 2 1/2 years, and males at 4 to 5 years. Sexually mature females leave the natal group, but males can remain with their natal group their entire life. The Central American squirrel monkey can live for more than 15 years.

The Central American squirrel monkey population declined precipitously after the 1970s. This decline is believed to be caused by deforestation, hunting, and capture to be kept as pets. Efforts are underway to preserve the species.

== Taxonomy ==
The Central American squirrel monkey is a member of the family Cebidae, the family of New World monkeys containing squirrel monkeys, capuchin monkeys, tamarins and marmosets. Within the family Cebidae, it is a member of the subfamily Saimiriinae, the subfamily containing squirrel monkeys. It is one of five recognized species of squirrel monkey, and the only species occurring outside South America. The Central American Squirrel Monkey is placed in genus Saimiri (Voigt, 1831) along with all the other squirrel monkey species. Among the squirrel monkeys, the Central American squirrel monkey is most closely related to the Guianan squirrel monkey (Saimiri sciureus) and the bare-eared squirrel monkey (Saimiri ustus) and these three species form the S. sciureus species group. The binomial name Saimiri oerstedii was given by Johannes Theodor Reinhardt in honor of his fellow Danish biologist Anders Sandøe Ørsted.

There are two subspecies of the Central American squirrel monkey:

- Black-crowned Central American squirrel monkey, Saimiri oerstedii oerstedii
- Grey-crowned Central American squirrel monkey, Saimiri oerstedii citrinellus

S. o. oerstedii lives in the western Pacific portion of Panama and the Osa Peninsula area of Costa Rica (including Corcovado National Park), while S. o. citrinellus lives in the Central Pacific portion of Costa Rica. The largest estimate (most recently in 2003) is that the remaining wild population of S. o. citrinellus is only 1,300 to 1,800 individuals.

== Physical description ==
The Central American squirrel monkey differs in coloration from South American squirrel monkeys. While South American squirrel monkeys tend to be primarily greenish in color, the Central American species has an orange back with olive shoulders, hips and tail, and white undersides. The hands and feet are also orange. There is a black cap at the top of the head, and a black tip at the end of the tail. Males generally have lighter caps than females. The face is white with black rims around the eyes and black around the nose and mouth.

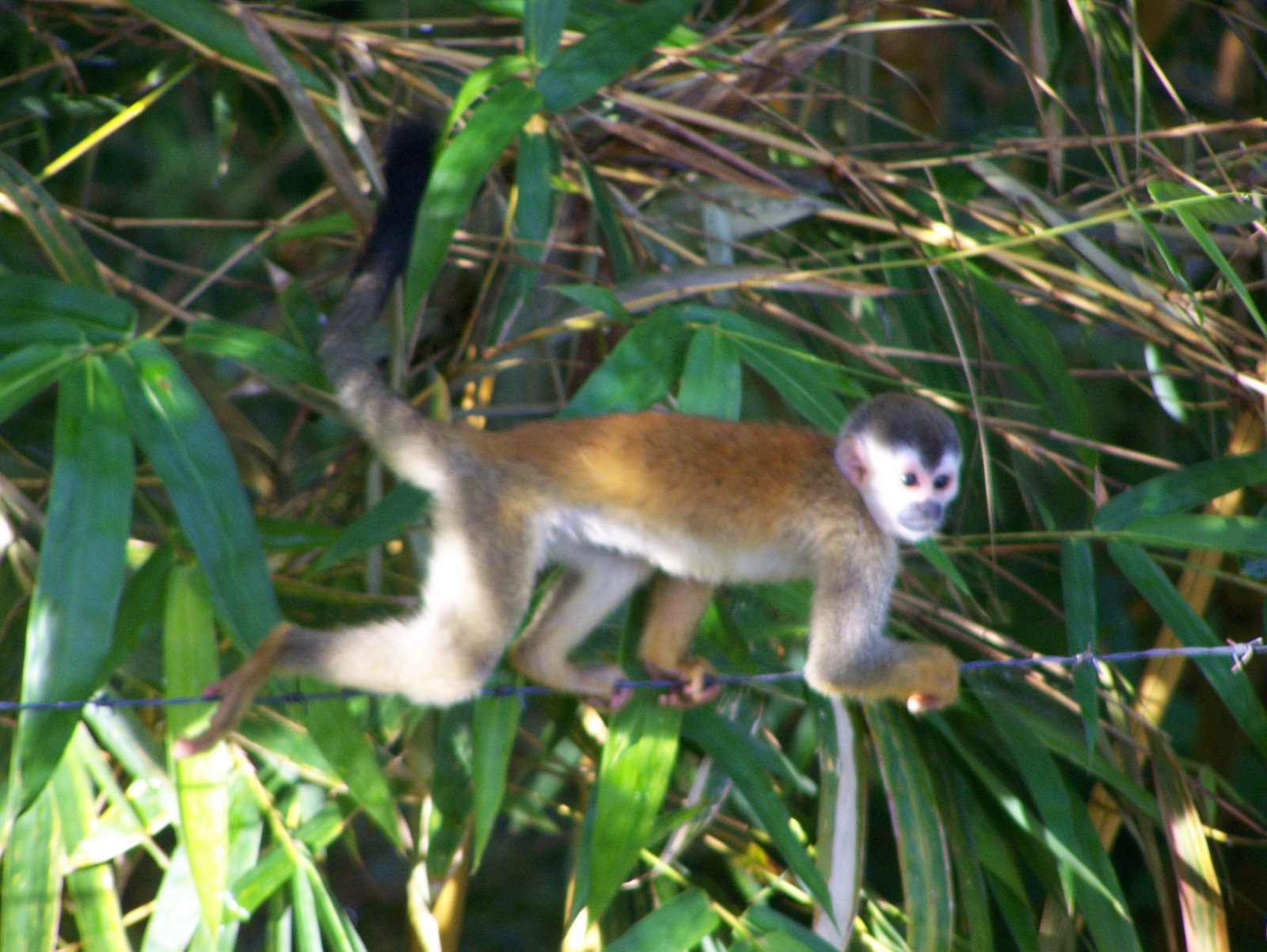
Body coloration

The two subspecies are similar in coloration, but differ in the shade of the cap. The northern subspecies, living in Central Pacific Costa Rica, has a lighter cap than the southern subspecies, which lives in Panama and in parts of Costa Rica near Panama. The southern subspecies also has more yellowish limbs and underparts.

Adults reach a length of between 266 and 291 millimetres (10 1/2 and 11 1/2 inches), excluding tail, and a weight between 600 and 950 grams (21 and 34 ounces). The tail is longer than the body, and between 362 and 389 mm (14 1/4 and 15 3/8 in) in length. As with other squirrel monkeys, there is considerable sexual dimorphism. On average, males weigh 16% more than females. Males have an average body weight of 829 g (29 1/4 oz) and females average 695 g (24 1/2 oz). Squirrel monkeys have the largest brains of all primates relative to their body size; the Central American squirrel monkey's brain weighs about 25.7 g (29/32 oz), or about 4% of its body weight. Unlike larger relatives, such as the capuchin, spider and howler monkeys, Central American squirrel monkeys do not have a fully prehensile tail, except as newborn infants, and the tail is primarily used to help with balance.

== Behavior ==
=== Social structure ===
The Central American squirrel monkey is arboreal and diurnal, and most often moves through the trees on four legs (quadrupedal locomotion). It lives in groups containing several adult males, adult females, and juveniles. The group size tends to be smaller than that of South American squirrel monkeys, but is still larger than for many other New World monkey species. The group generally numbers between 20 and 75 monkeys, with a mean of 41 monkeys. Groups in excess of 100 sometimes occur, but these are believed to be temporary mergers of two groups. On average, groups contain about 60% more females than males.

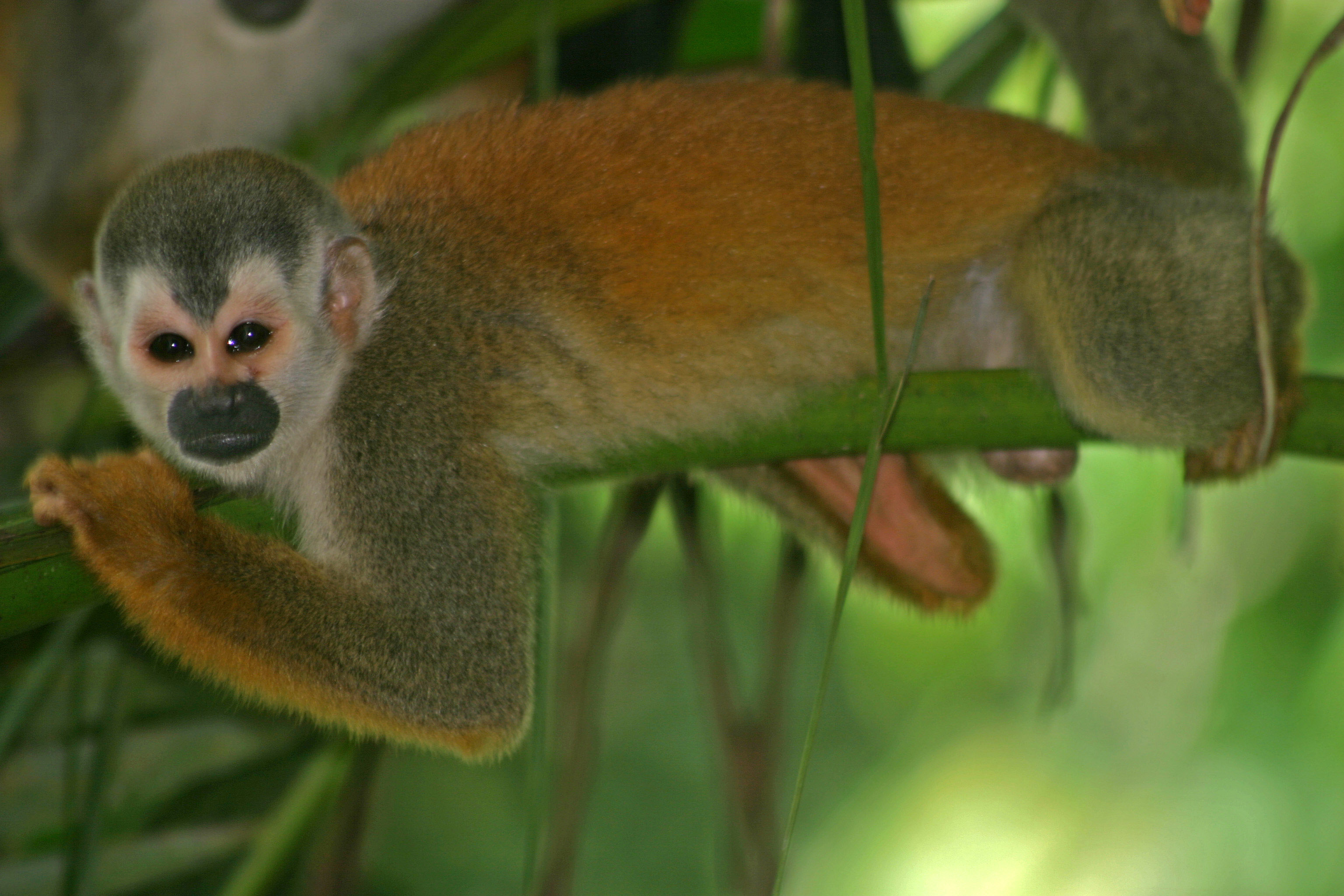
Resting on a branch

The squirrel monkey groups have a home range of between 35 and 63 hectares (86 and 156 acres). Group ranges can overlap, especially in large, protected areas such as Manuel Antonio National Park. Less overlap occurs in more fragmented areas. Groups can travel between 2,500 and 4,200 m (8,200 and 13,800 ft) per day. Unlike some other monkey species, the group does not split into separate foraging groups during the day. Individual monkeys may separate from the main group to engage in different activities for periods of time, and thus the group may be dispersed over an area of up to 1.2 hectares (3 acres) at any given time. The group tends to sleep in the same trees every night for months at a time, unlike other squirrel monkeys.

There are no dominance hierarchies among the females, and the females do not form coalitions. Males in the group are generally related to each other and thus tend to form strong affiliations, and only form dominance hierarchies during the breeding season. This is especially the case among males of the same age. Neither males nor females are dominant over each other, an egalitarian social system that is unique to Central American squirrel monkeys. In South American species, either the females (S. boliviensis) or males (S. sciureus) are dominant over the other sex, and both sexes form stable dominance hierarchies. Groups of Central American squirrel monkeys generally do not compete or fight with each other. Male Costa Rican squirrel monkeys are known to have very close bonds with each other.

Although South American species of squirrel monkeys often travel with and feed together with capuchin monkeys, the Central American squirrel monkey only rarely associates with the white-headed capuchin. This appears to be related to the fact that the food the Central American squirrel monkey eats is distributed in smaller, more dispersed patches than that of South American squirrel monkeys. As a result of the different food distribution, associating with capuchin monkeys would impose higher foraging costs for the Central American squirrel monkey than for their South American counterparts. In addition, while male white-headed capuchins are alert to predators, they devote more attention to detecting rival males than to detecting predators, and relatively less time to detecting predators than their South American counterparts. Therefore, associating with capuchins would provide less predator detection benefits and impose higher foraging costs on the Central American squirrel monkey than on South American squirrel monkeys. An alternative explanation is that capuchin groups are larger than squirrel monkey groups in Central America, but in South America the squirrel monkey groups are larger.

In one study a slight tendency was observed in which Central American squirrel monkeys were more likely to travel near mantled howler monkeys if the howlers were vocalizing loudly within their home range, but no physical contact or obvious social interaction was observed. Variegated and red-tailed squirrels may join Central American monkey groups without eliciting a reaction from the monkeys.

Certain bird species associate with the Central American squirrel monkey. The birds follow the monkeys in an attempt to prey on insects and small vertebrates that the monkeys flush out. At Corcovado National Park, bird species known to regularly follow squirrel monkeys include the double-toothed kite, the grey-headed tanager and the tawny-winged woodcreeper, but other woodcreepers and such species as motmots and trogons do so as well. This activity increases during the wet season, when arthropods are harder to find.

=== Diet ===
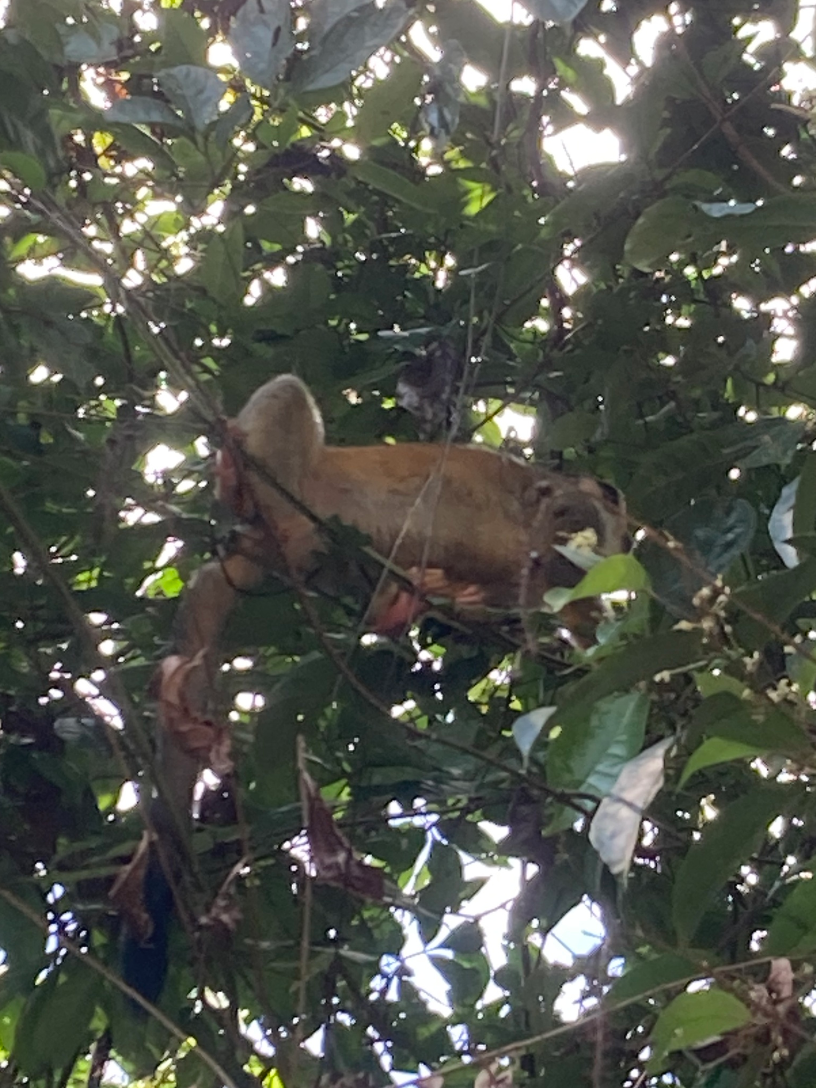
Saimiri oerstedii in a tree foraging for food, Manuel Antinono Costa Rica

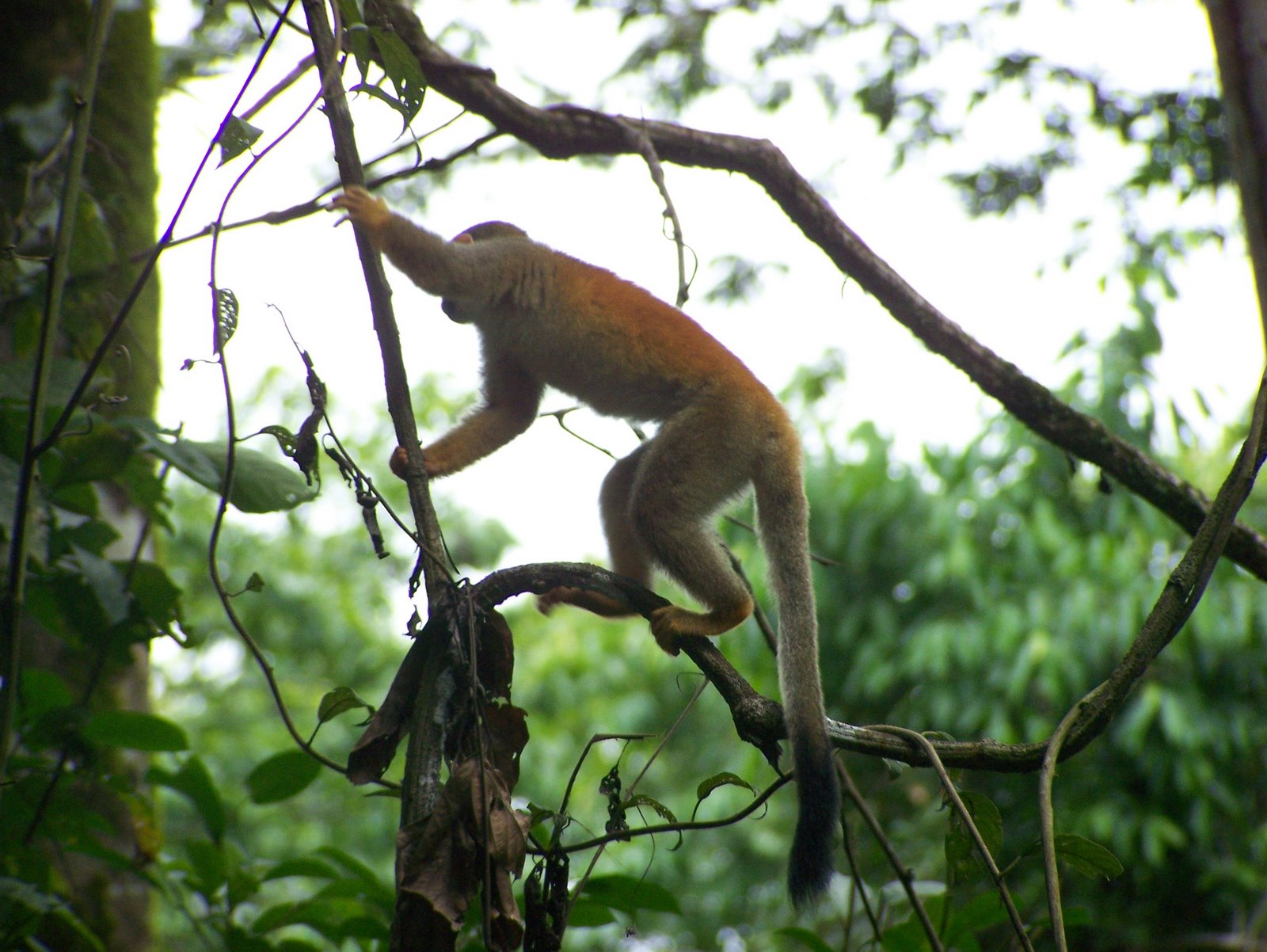
Foraging in Manuel Antonio National Park

The Central American squirrel monkey is omnivorous. Its diet includes insects and insect larvae (especially grasshoppers and caterpillars), spiders, fruit, leaves, bark, flowers, and nectar. It also eats small vertebrates, including bats, birds, lizards, and tree frogs. It finds its food foraging through the lower and middle levels of the forest, typically between 4.5 and 9 metres (15 and 30 feet) high. Two-thirds to three-quarters of each day is spent foraging for food. It has difficulty finding its desired food late in the wet season, when fewer arthropods are available.

It has a unique method of capturing tent-making bats. It looks for roosting bats by looking for their tents (which are made of a folded leaf). When it finds a bat it climbs to a higher level and jumps onto the tent from above, attempting to dislodge the bat. If the fallen bat does not fly away in time, the monkey pounces on it on the ground and eats it.

The Central American squirrel monkey is an important seed disperser and a pollinator of certain flowers, including the passion flower. While it is not a significant agricultural pest, it does sometimes eat corn, coffee, bananas and mangos. Other fruits eaten include cecropias, legumes, figs, palms, cerillo, quiubra, yayo flaco and wild cashew fruits.

=== Communication ===
The Central American squirrel monkey is noisy. It makes many squeals, whistles and chirps. It also travels through the forest noisily, disturbing vegetation as it moves through. It has four main calls, which have been described as a "smooth chuck", a "bent mask chuck", a "peep" and a "twitter".

=== Predators ===
Predators of the Central American squirrel monkey include birds of prey, cats and snakes. Constricting and venomous snakes both prey on squirrel monkeys. Raptors are particularly effective predators of Central American squirrel monkeys. The oldest males bear most of the responsibility for detecting predators. When a Central American squirrel monkey detects a raptor, it gives a high-pitched alarm peep and dives for cover. All other squirrel monkeys that hear the alarm call also dive for cover. The monkeys are particularly cautious about raptors, and give alarms when they detect any raptor-like object, including small airplanes and even falling branches and large leaves.

Predator detection by males becomes particularly important during the period when the infants are born. Raptors spend significantly more time near the squirrel monkey troops during this period, and prey on a significant number of newborn infants. Other animals that prey on Central American squirrel monkey infants include toucans, tayras, opossums, coatis, snakes, and even spider monkeys.

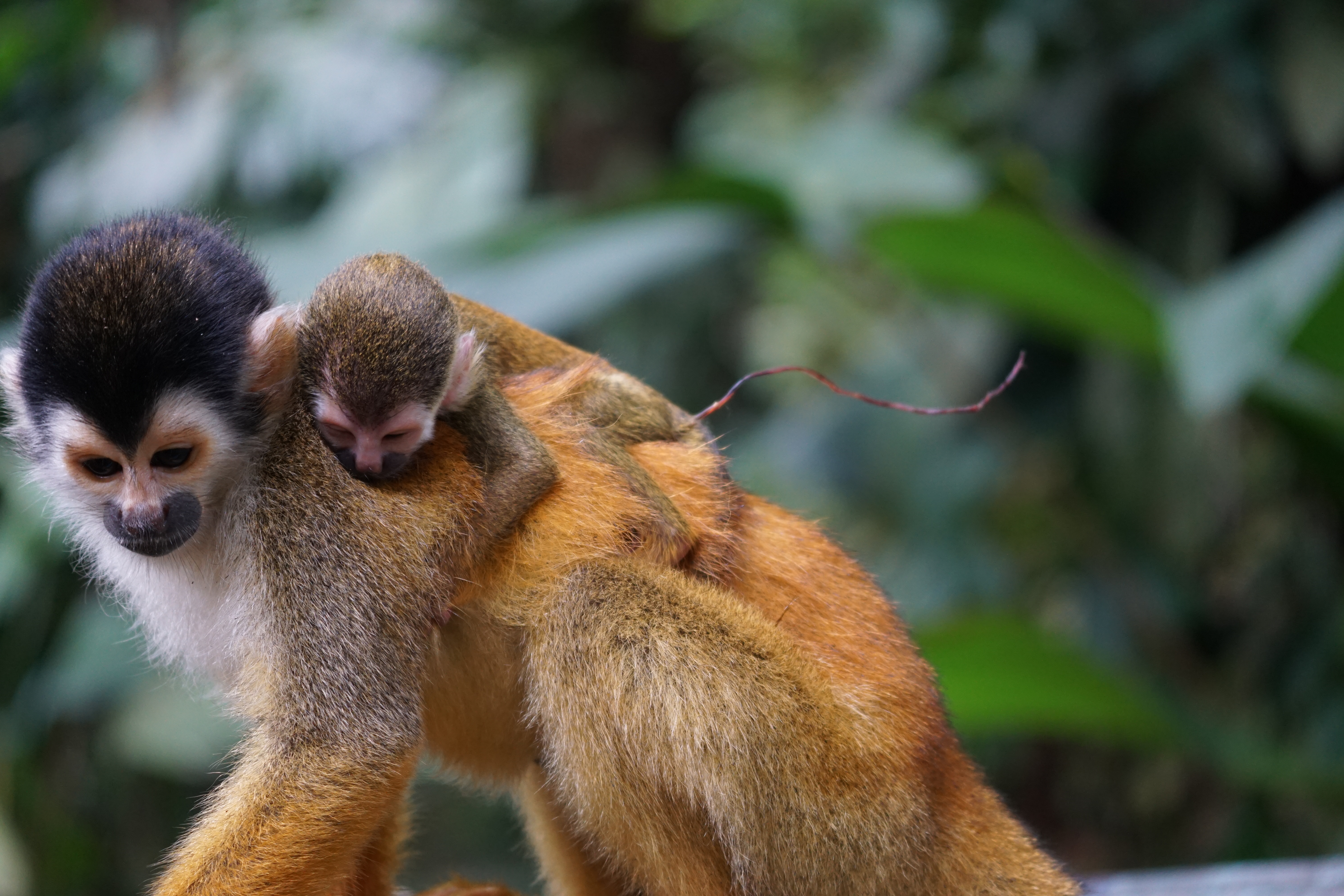
Mother and one-day old baby with umbilical cord still attached. Golfo Dulce Retreat, Costa Rica.

== Reproduction ==
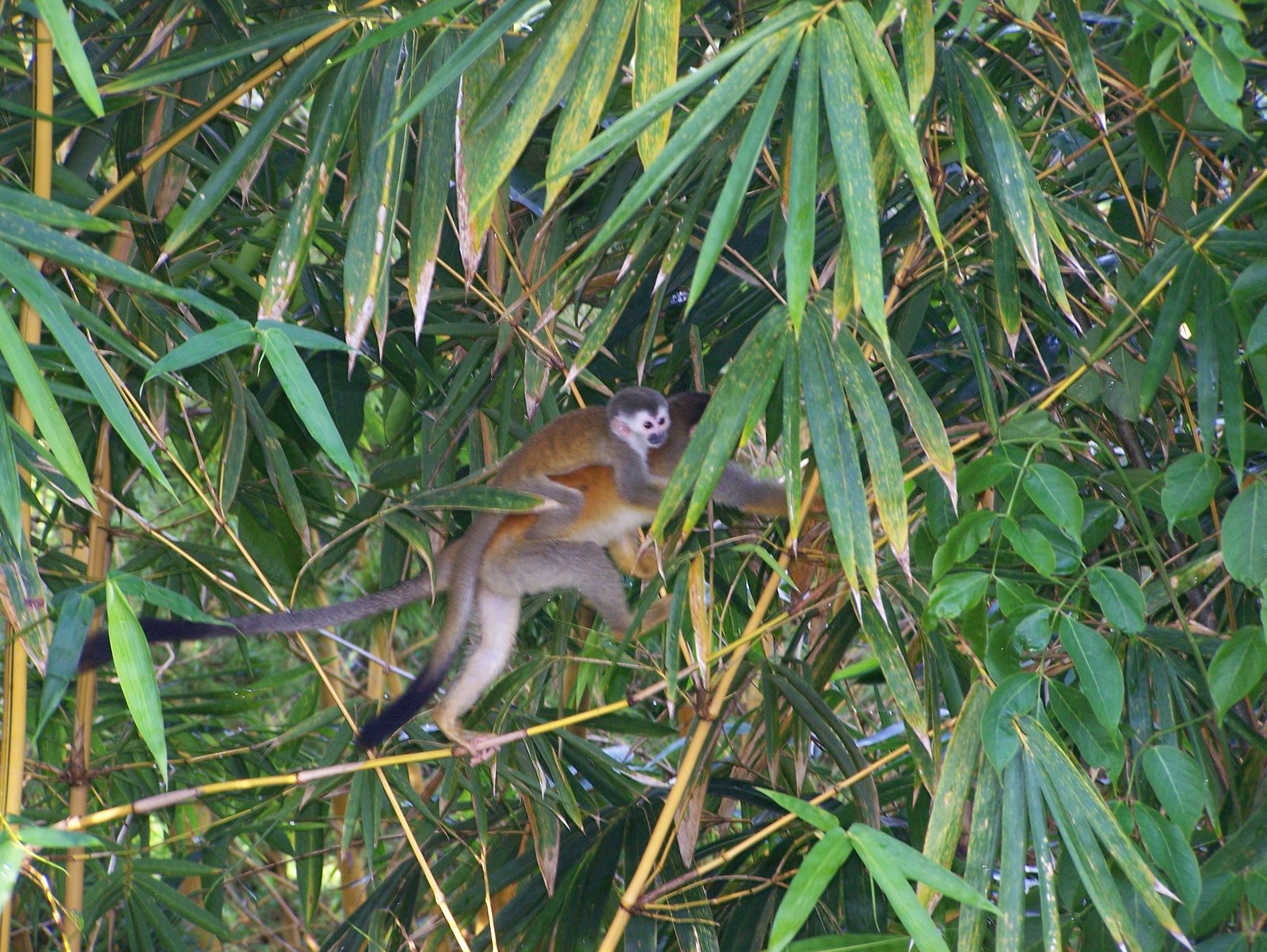
Two-month-old infant riding on mother's back

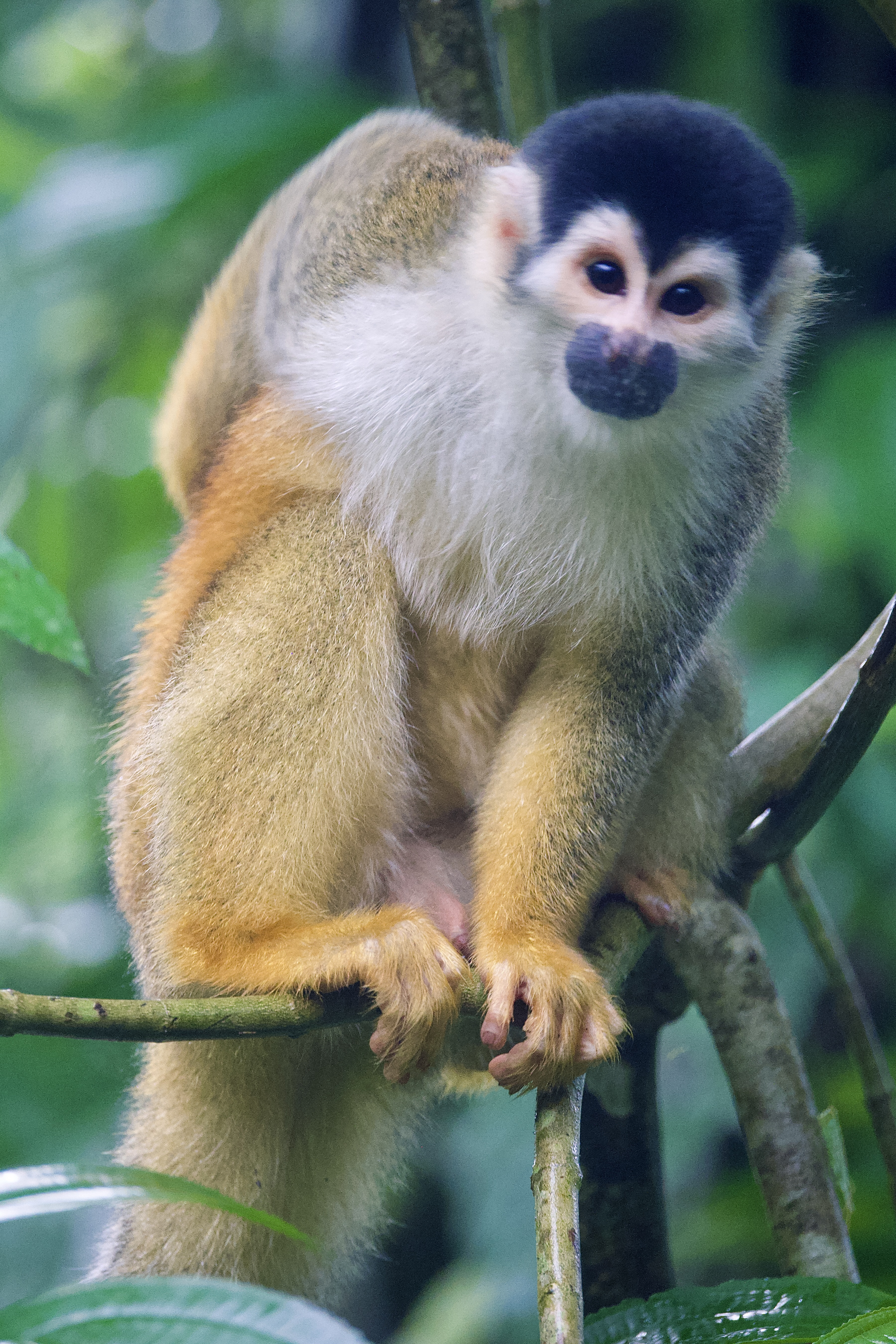
Male specimen displaying seasonal sexual dimorphism. Golfo Dulce Retreat, Costa Rica

The breeding season for the Central American squirrel monkey is in September. All females come into estrus at virtually the same time. A month or two before the breeding season begins, males become larger (seasonal sexual dimorphism). This is not due to extra muscle, but to altered water balance within the male's body. This is caused by the conversion of the male hormone testosterone into estrogen; thus the more testosterone a male produces, the more he grows in advance of the breeding season. Since males within a group have not been observed fighting over access to females during the breeding season, nor attempting to force females to copulate with them, it is believed that female choice determines which males get to breed with females. Females tend to prefer the males that expand the most in advance of breeding season. This may be because the most enlarged males are generally the oldest and the most effective at detecting predators, or it may be a case of runaway intersexual selection.

Males sometimes leave their group for short periods of time during the breeding season in order to try to mate with females from neighboring groups. Females are receptive to males from other groups, although resident males attempt to repel the intruders. The gestation period is six months, and the infants are born within a single week during February and March. Typically, a single infant is born.

Only 50% of infants survive more than six months, largely due to predation by birds. The infant remains dependent on its mother for about one year. Females give birth every 12 months, so the prior infant becomes independent at about the same time the new infant is born. Females become sexually mature at 2 1/2 years old, while males become sexually mature at between 4 and 5 years old. The females leave their natal group upon reaching sexual maturity, while males usually remain with their group for their entire lives. This is different from South American squirrel monkey species, where either males disperse from their natal group or both sexes disperse. Males of the same age tend to associate with each other in age cohorts. Upon reaching sexual maturity, an age cohort may choose to leave the group and attempt to oust the males from another group in order to attain increased reproductive opportunities.

The lifespan of the Central American squirrel monkey in the wild is unknown, but captive specimens have been known to live more than 15 years. Other squirrel monkey species are known to be able to live more than 20 years.

== Distribution and habitat ==
The Central American squirrel monkey has a restricted distribution in Costa Rica and Panama. It lives only near the Pacific coast. Its range covers Central Pacific Costa Rica in the north through western Panama. It lives in two of Costa Rica's national parks—Manuel Antonio National Park and Corcovado National Park—where it can be seen by visitors, but it is not as commonly seen in these parks as the white-headed capuchin or the mantled howler monkeys. It lives in lowland forests and is restricted to secondary forests and primary forests which have been partially logged. It requires forests with abundant low and mid-level vegetation and has difficulty surviving in tall, mature, undisturbed forests that lack such vegetation. Its specialization for coastal lowland forest may explain its restricted distribution.

== Conservation status ==
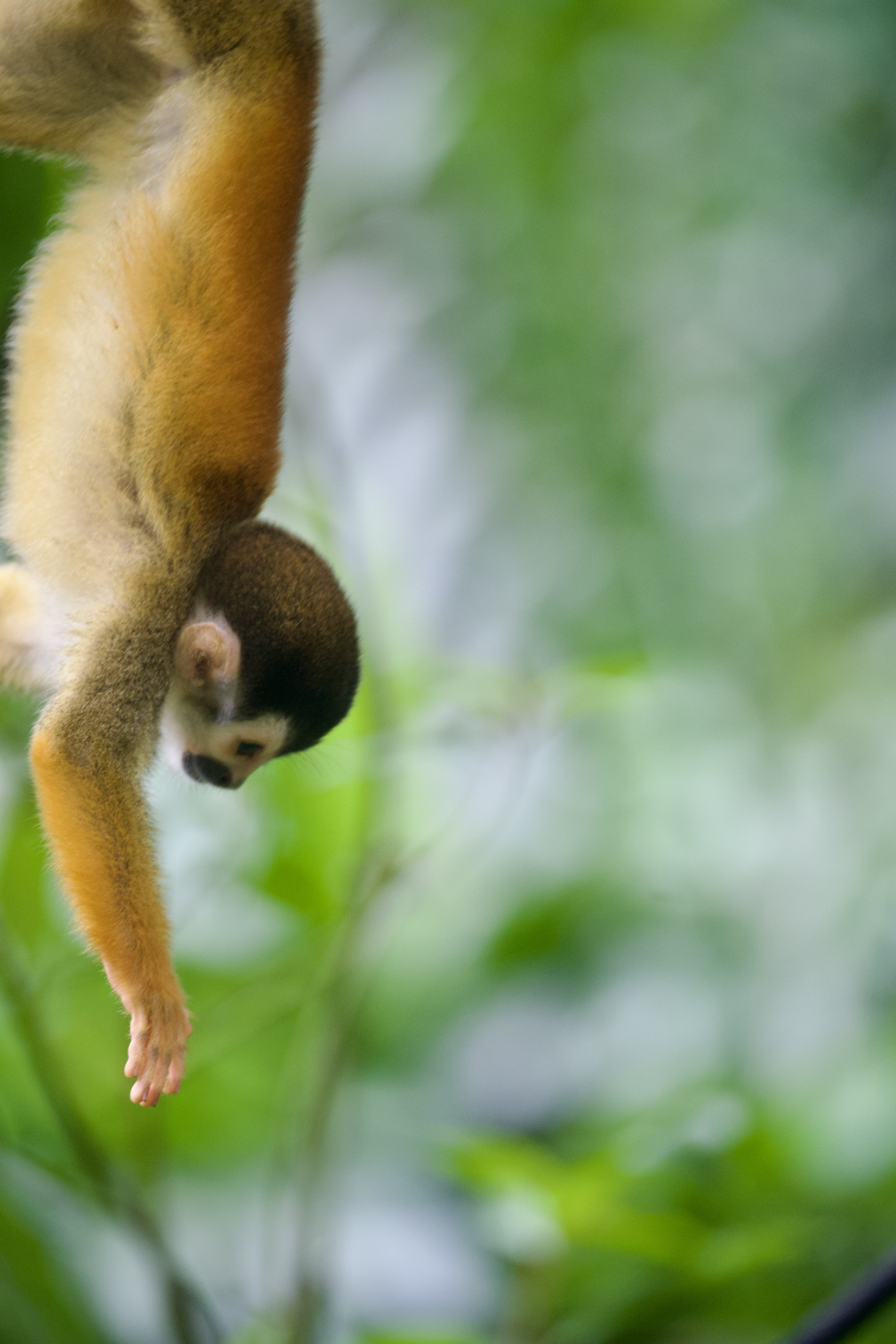
Photographed at Golfo Dulce Retreat, Costa Rica.

It was once believed that the Central American squirrel monkey was just a population of a South American species of squirrel monkey brought to Central America by humans. Evidence for this theory included the very small range of the Central American squirrel monkey and the large gap from the range of any other squirrel monkey species. A study of nuclear and mitochondrial DNA demonstrated that the Central American squirrel monkey is indeed a separate species that apparently diverged from the South American species long ago – at least 260,000 years ago and possibly more than 4 million years ago. A genetic study by Lynch Alfaro, et al. in 2015 estimated that the Central American squirrel monkey diverged from S. scuireus a little less than 1 million years ago.

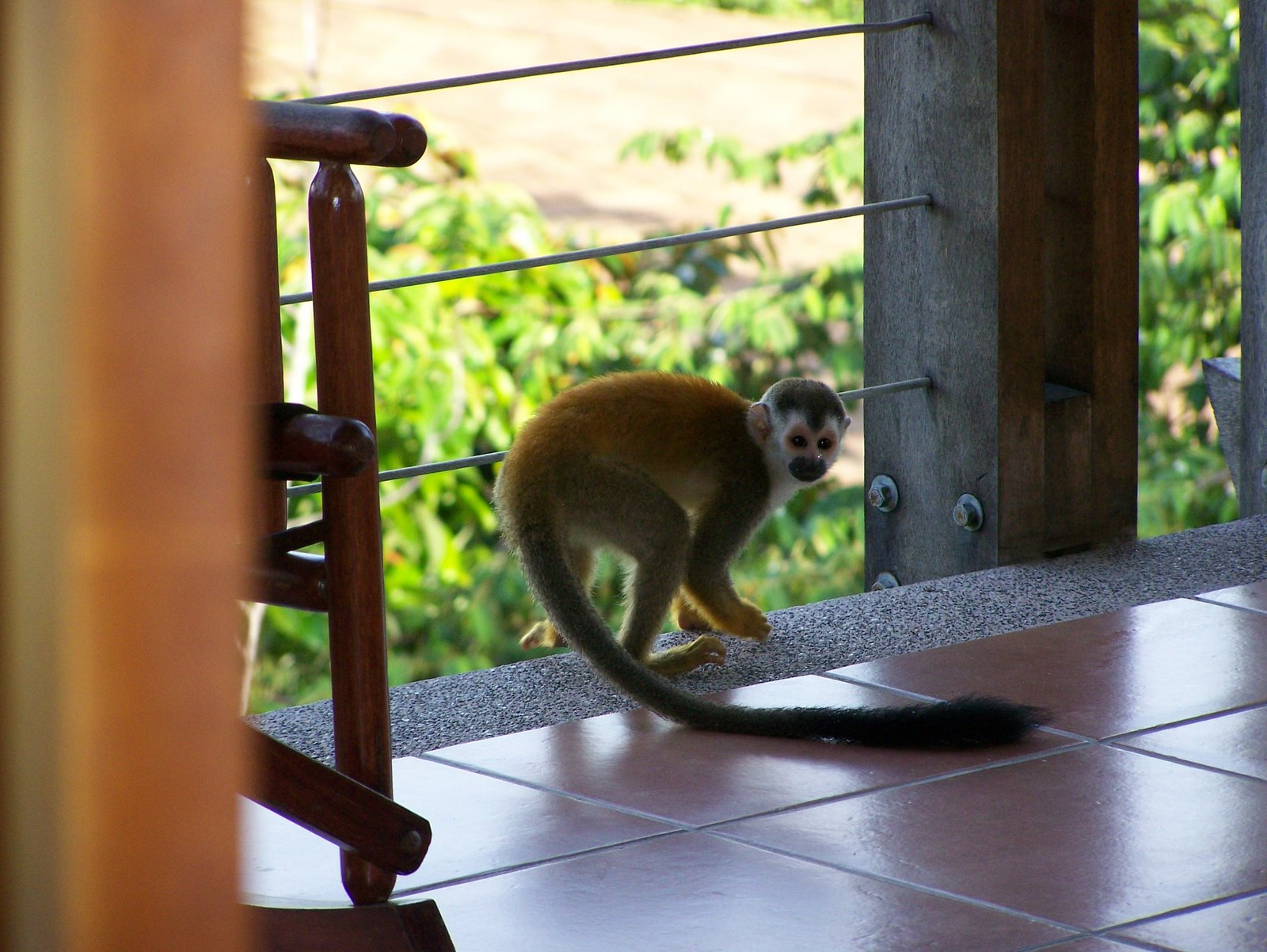
On a balcony of a hotel near Manuel Antonio National Park, Costa Rica

One popular theory is that squirrel monkeys did live in Colombia during the late Miocene or Pliocene and these squirrel monkeys migrated to Central America, becoming the ancestors of the current Central American species. According to this theory, the Guatemalan black howler migrated to Central America around the same time. Passage through the isthmus of Panama later closed due to rising oceans, and eventually opened up to another wave of migration about 2 million years ago. These later migrants, ancestors to modern populations of white-headed capuchins, mantled howlers and Geoffroy's spider monkeys, out-competed the earlier migrants, leading to the small range of the Central American squirrel monkey and Guatemalan black howler. Ford suggested that high water levels during the Pleistocene not only cut off the Central American squirrel monkey from other squirrel monkeys, but was also responsible for the formation of two subspecies. Lynch Alfaro, et al. suggested that the separation of the Central American squirrel monkey from other squirrel monkeys may have resulted from a period of high aridity in northern South America.

The population density has been estimated at 36 monkeys per square kilometer (93 per square mile) in Costa Rica and 130 monkeys per square kilometer (337 per square mile) in Panama. It has been estimated that the population of the Central American squirrel monkey has been reduced from about 200,000 in the 1970s to less than 5,000. This is believed to be largely due to deforestation, hunting, and capture for the pet trade. There are significant efforts within Costa Rica to try to preserve this monkey from extinction. A reforestation project within Panama tries to preserve the vanishing population of the Chiriqui Province.

As of 2021, the Central American squirrel monkey is listed as endangered from a conservation standpoint by the IUCN. This is due mainly to deforestation ongoing habitat loss, but other sources such as capture for the pet trade also contribute.
