= Corcovado National Park =

National park in Costa Rica

- IUCN category II (national park)
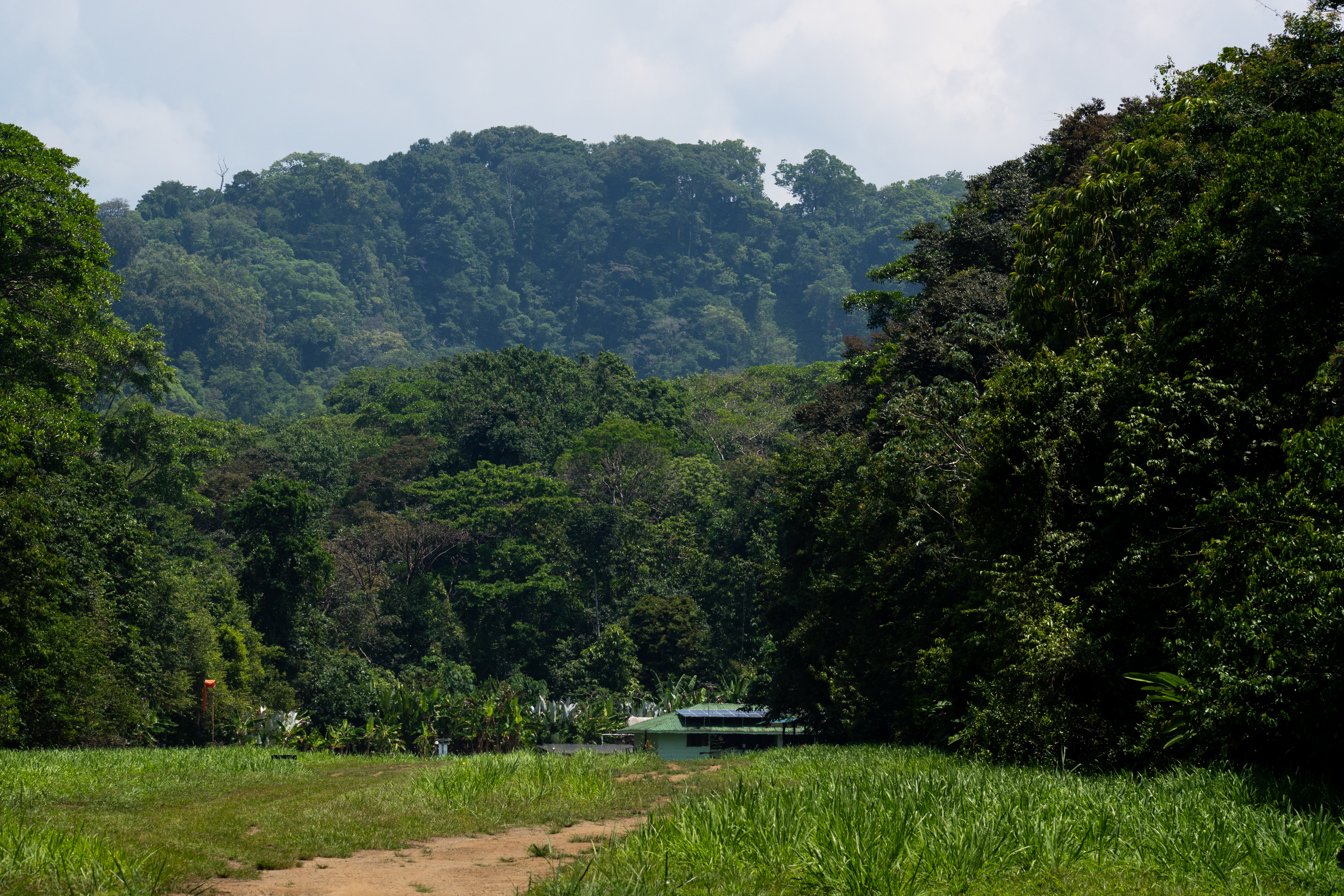
- Sirena Station at Corcovado National Park in Costa Rica
- Location: Osa Peninsula, Costa Rica
- Coordinates: 8°33′0″N 83°35′0″W
- Area: 424 km^{2} (164 sq mi)
- Established: October 24, 1975
- Governing body: National System of Conservation Areas (SINAC)
- Location in Costa Rica

Corcovado National Park (Spanish: Parque Nacional Corcovado) is a National Park on the Osa Peninsula, in Osa Canton, located on the southwestern regions of Costa Rica (9° North, 83° West), which is a part of the Osa Conservation Area. Corcovado National Park was established on October 24, 1975 and occupies an area of 424 square kilometres (164 sq mi). It is currently the largest park in Costa Rica and extends over about a third of the Osa Peninsula.

The park has the largest primary forest on the American Pacific coastline and is also one of the few remaining sizable areas of lowland tropical forests in the world. Historically, logging has taken place in lowland areas due to their easy accessibility and the presence of the largest and most abundant economically valuable trees. But in those habitats, which feature the diverse vegetation, are also usually the richest in biodiversity. What is left of the originally rich lowland forests is usually too small an area to support the original natural biodiversity.

== Biodiversity ==
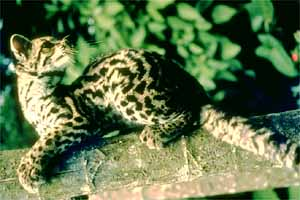
A Margay in Corcovado.

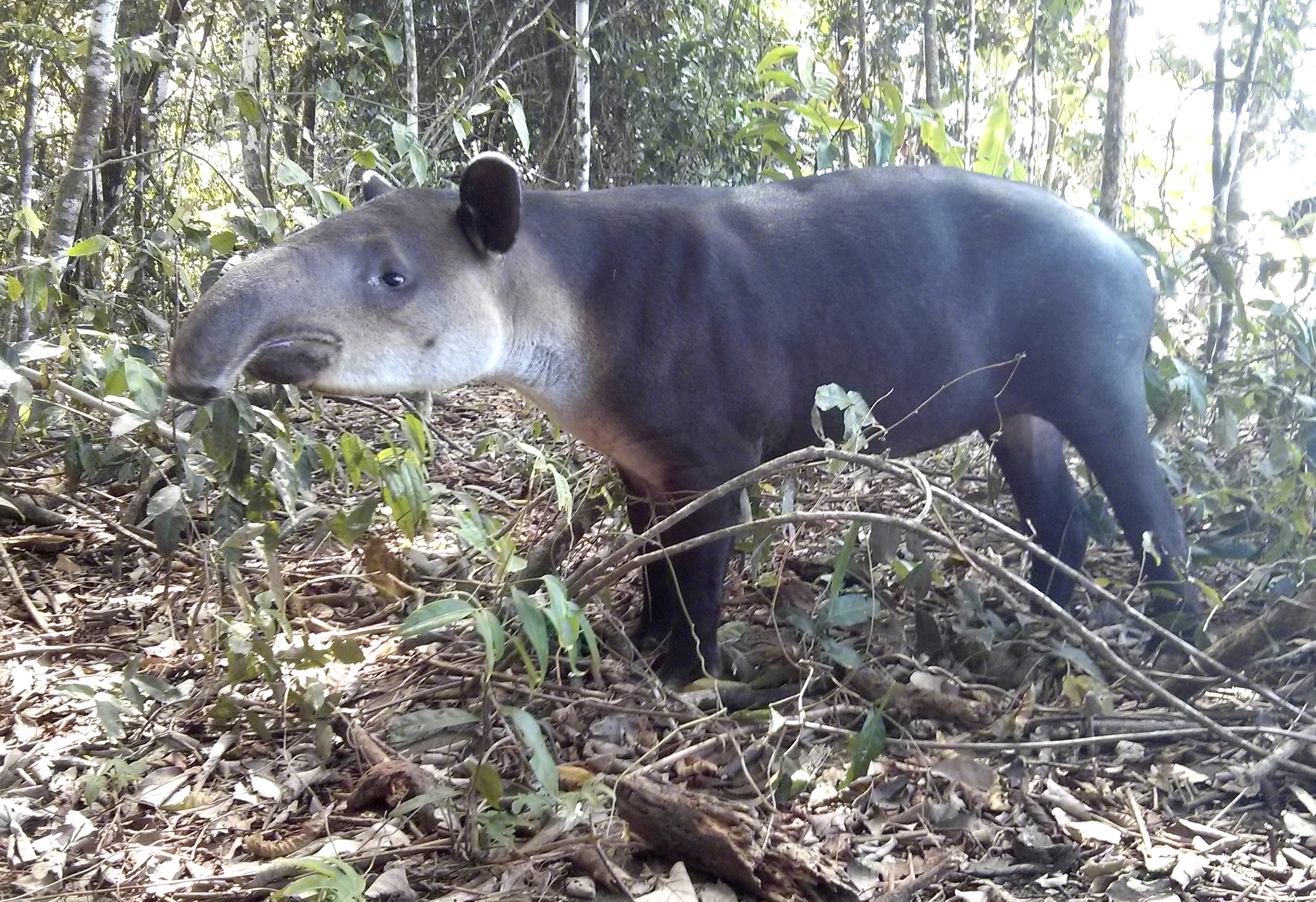
Tapir

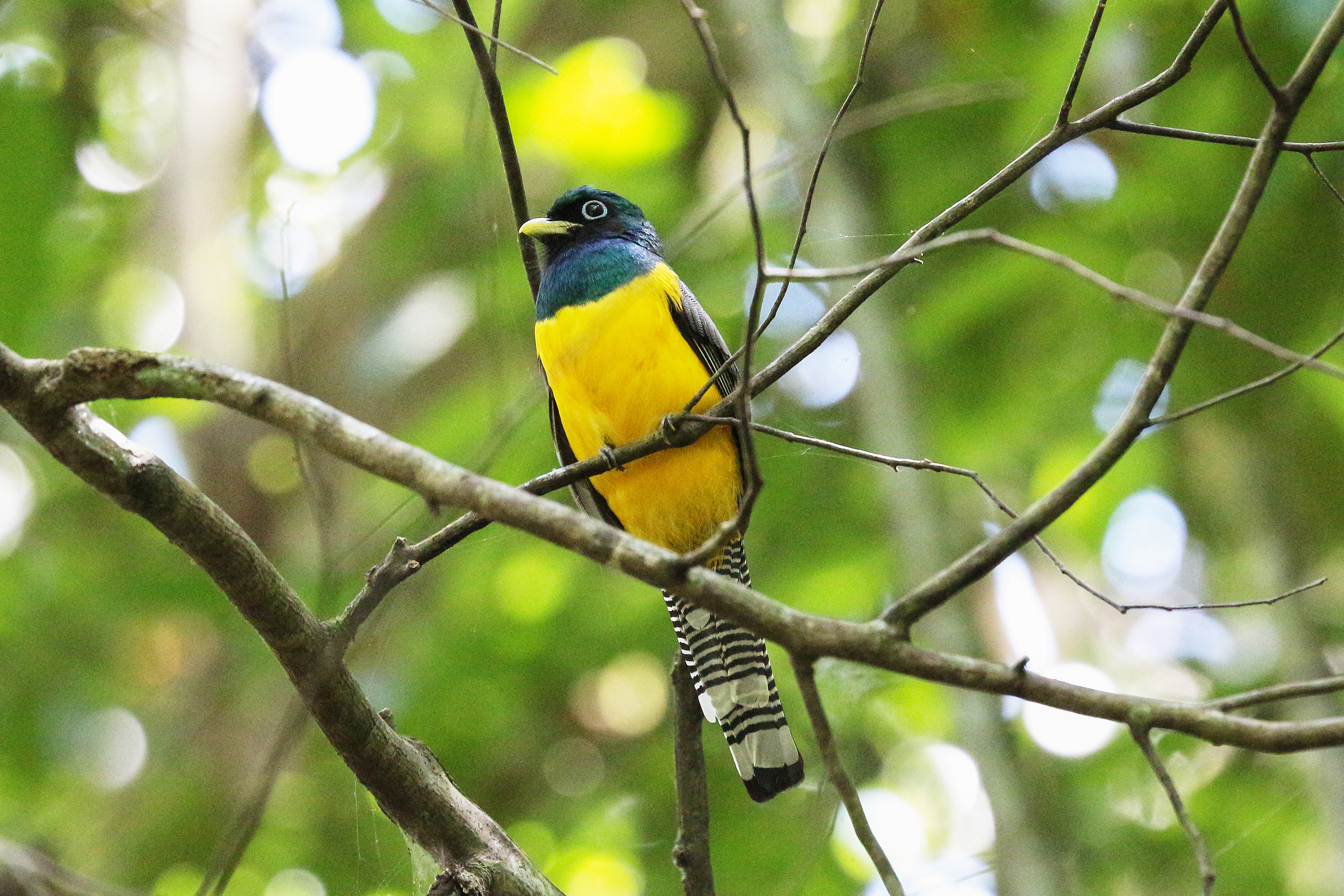
Guianan trogon

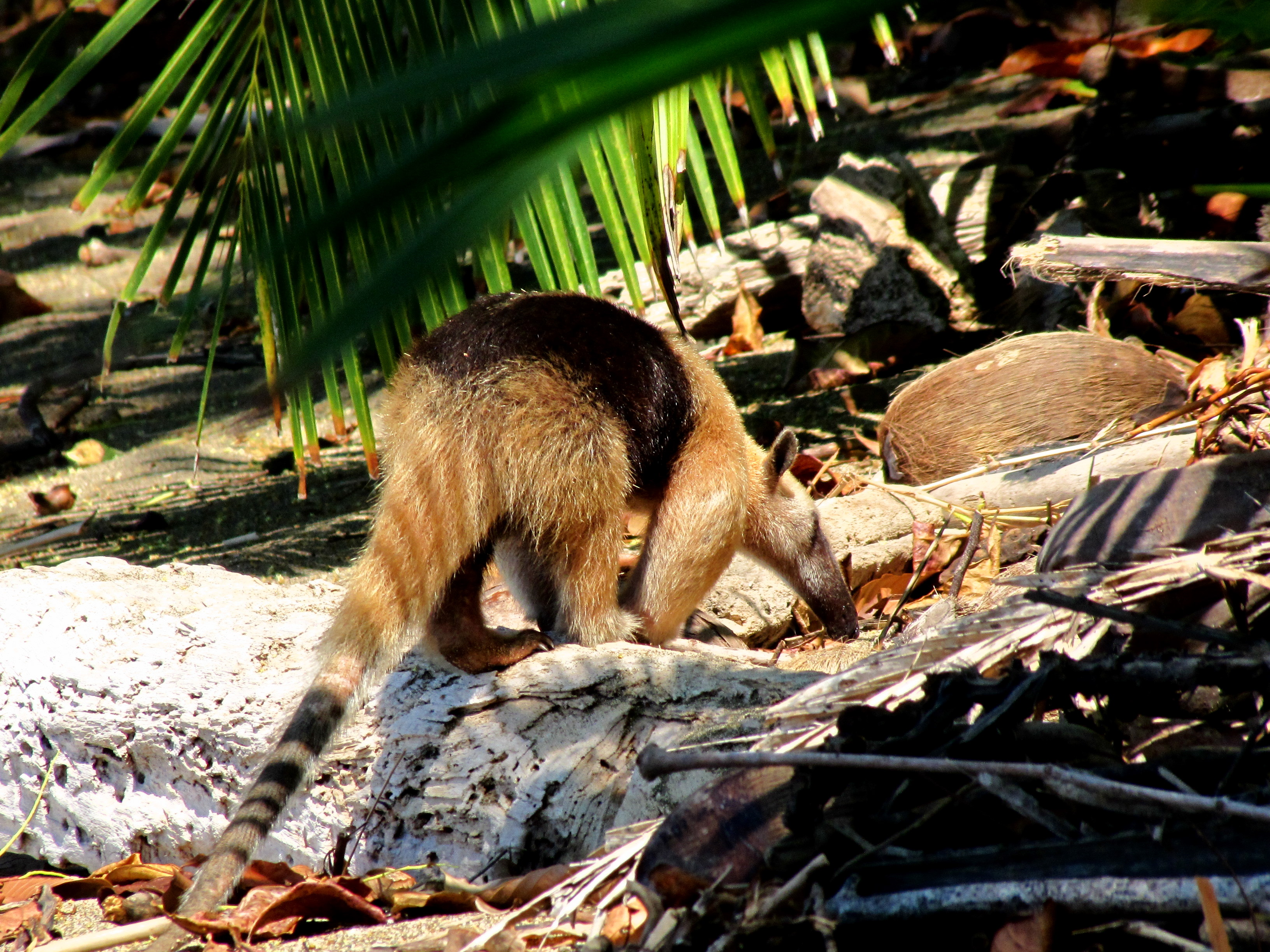
Tamandua anteater

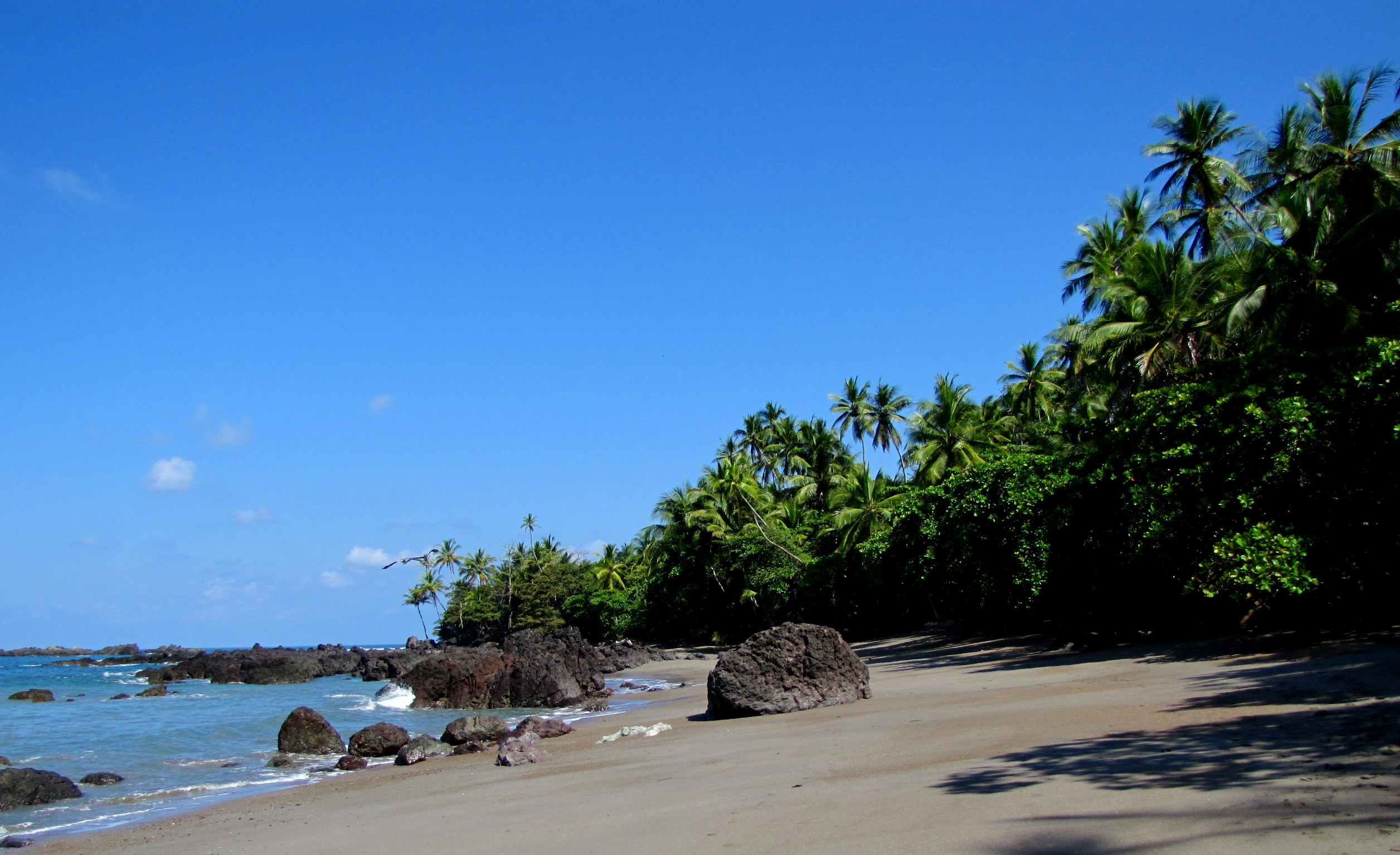
Corcovado National Park

Corcovado is home to the endangered Baird's tapir and a small harpy eagle population. The park's rivers and lagoons are home to the American crocodile and spectacled caiman, along with bull sharks. Several felines are also present, including the jaguar, ocelot, margay, jaguarundi, and puma. All four Costa Rican monkey species are known to live within the park, including the endangered Central American squirrel monkey, white-faced capuchin, mantled howler, and Geoffroy's spider monkey. Other mammals include two-toed and three-toed sloth, collared peccary, northern tamandua, and silky anteater. Poison dart frogs, red-eyed tree frogs, glass frogs, and several species of snake (including the venomous fer-de-lance and bushmaster) are also present within the park.

Most animal sightings can be expected along the coast, including scarlet macaws (the largest population in the country), hermit crabs, pelicans, spider monkeys, tamandua anteaters, pumas, white faced capuchin monkeys, lineated woodpeckers and coatis.

Other animals in the park include Central American squirrel monkeys, mantled howler monkeys, both two-toed and three-toed sloths, agoutis, giant anteaters, great curassows, black hawks, spectacled owls, hummingbirds, 220 species of butterflies, golden orb spiders, otters and raccoons. Four species of sea turtle (green, Pacific ridley, hawksbill, and leatherback) nest on the beaches.

The abundance in wildlife can in part be explained by the variety of vegetation zones, at least thirteen, including montane forest (which covers more than half the park) cloud forest, jolillo forest (palm swamp), prairie forest, alluvial plains forest, swamp forest, freshwater herbaceous swamp and mangrove, together holding over 500 tree species, including purple heart, poponjoche, nargusta, banak, cow tree, espave and crabwood. The high biodiversity is also attributed to Costa Rica's position on a north-south corridor for flora and fauna; part of the "land bridge" and wildlife corridor that links the large continents of North America and South America. In 41,800 hectares, Corcovado houses 2.5% of the world's biodiversity.

The waters of the park are rich in biodiversity. The coasts are wintering and breeding grounds for humpback whales that come each winter. Other baleen whales also migrate through the area such as Bryde's whale. Dolphins such as spinner and rough-toothed, and smaller cetaceans such as false killer whales and killer whales are seasonal migrants to these areas. Manatees are occasionally reported at Manzanillo Beach, Talamanca, and Limon.

== Creation ==
Although Corcovado National Park is a popular tourist destination, there are many threats facing the National Park. Before Corcovado National Park's creation, the government used to release criminals on the peninsula, and many other people would mine the land for gold through various methods, such as panning. These strategies created negative impacts on the ecosystem like soil erosion, water contamination from types of machinery, and trenching. Land development companies, mining, and livestock production led to deforestation and water contamination in the park which contributed to the destruction of aquatic life. Prior to 1975, when the park was first constructed, the Osa Peninsula population was fewer than 7,000 people. Many locals utilized the land for cattle and pig farming and lived off subsistence livelihoods. After the creation of Interamerican Highway South, the population doubled in size including people who were interested in land development such as farmers, loggers, and miners.

Because of the remoteness of the peninsula, logging only began in the 1960s. By 1975 there were plans for a major international logging operation. Researchers petitioned President Daniel Oduber to protect the area, which he did by making it a National Park. For this, he received the Albert Schweitzer Award from the Animal Welfare Institute. The already present gold miners were allowed to stay. By 1986 their number had increased to about 1,000 (not counting their families), who also hunted wildlife. It was decided to evict them. However, illegal mining still occurs (using more destructive, modern methods). The number of miners is estimated to be about 400. It is estimated that 38% of the park (16.000 hectares) has been exploited by gold miners.

== Threats ==
The Osa Peninsula is home to 2.5% of the world's biodiversity. The impacts of tourism, mining, and deforestation cause declines in the biodiversity of native Costa Rican terrestrial and aquatic species. The lowland tropical forest features many diverse habitats that are home to various species including endangered and threatened species. There are thousands of species in the park including wild cats, rare birds, sea turtles, sharks, humpback whales, monkeys, and many more. Species in Costa Rica like the jaguar, Baird's tapir, and the peccary are often threatened and even endangered due to commercial development. After many years of mining, the presence of the seed distributors – tapirs, peccaries, and agoutis– was noticeably decreasing in numbers.

In the 1970s, the Costa Rican government banned gold mining, however, this did not put an end to the mining problems. Between the 1970s and 1980s, the Costa Rican government passed environmental conservation laws that encompassed protections against deforestation, illegal hunting and mining, and reforestation plans. Despite the ban, many locals still depended on gold mining and continued to do so illegally, they would look for gold in the rivers outside the national park and source food from the illegal hunting of animals and collection of sea turtle eggs. Illegal hunting has also rapidly diminished the population of jaguars and pacas in the park. In 2008, park rangers began to protect certain native species such as peccaries, however, locals would continue to hunt these species because peccaries would damage their crops ultimately damaging their livelihood. Despite keeping the populations of peccary safe, the divide between the locals and the national park deepened. Despite the rapidly declining populations, some conservationists are not as concerned about these populations as others. Public officials from the Ministry of Public Security, national park rangers, and conservationists from the Golfo Dulce Forest Reserve and the Osa Conservation Area (ACOSA) have increased patrolling in the park in an attempt to catch illegal miners. However, this has created issues with the local communities since some people still depend on gold mining as a source of income.

There has been a lot of disagreement among conservationists and local community members in the Osa Peninsula due to the changes in land development. This is mostly due to the history of the region, many locals in the Osa Peninsula have depended on the region for their livelihood. Livestock farming of cattle and swine, gold mining through panning the waterways, and hunting animals in the region of Corcovado National Park allowed many of the locals to survive in the region for many years before the creation of the park. Most of the miners started mining because they were unemployed and it allowed them a sense of personal freedom. However, after the passing of the conservation laws, many locals began to pursue other activities for a source of income such as tourism. Corcovado National Park sees thousands of eco-tourists a day which contributes revenue mostly to the Costa Rican government. The tourism industry in Costa Rica recruits many locals to work in the parks as tour guides and park rangers, hotels and restaurants, and other services as well. After the tourist industry experienced a temporary collapse from COVID-19, illegal miners and illegal hunters returned to their old ways since their new livelihood could no longer support them. Due to the enforcement of conservation laws, park rangers are required to suppress and report illegal activities; between the locals partaking in illegal activities and park rangers' enforcement, tensions and hostility are high.

Mining practices such as gold panning, larger corporations that partake in mining and deforestation, and hunting create negative consequences for the various ecosystems in Corcovado National Park. The geographic region of Corcovado has excellent conditions for high biodiversity and also for deforestation and mining. The Osa Peninsula is filled with various coastal aquatic and terrestrial ecosystems like rainforests and beaches. The powerful rains from the forests feed into the complex system of rivers and tributaries leading into the Pacific Ocean. Heavy rainfalls can create dangerous conditions in certain parts of the Osa Peninsula which can deter tourists and those who are not familiar with the region, but not miners and hunters. “Oreros” first came into the Osa Peninsula in the 1930s and this form of livelihood has remained in the region ever since. Individual miners would utilize a technique known as “panning” where they sift sand and dirt in the ocean or rivers through a pan until gold sediments are found. The larger group of industrial miners and loggers used large machinery to cut down the trees in the forest and to wash large amounts of sediments. Although gold panning is a form of mining, the ecosystem impacts can vary depending on the mineral being mined, the scale of the mining operation, and the current condition of the ecosystem – damaged, restored, or preserved. The negative effects of gold mining on the environment are increased sedimentation in waterways, erosion of streambanks, accelerated evaporation of surface water, and mineral pollution from wastewater. The introduction of sediments like heavy metals (toxic metal mercury), sulfates, and other pollutants can result in environmental degradation such as the elimination of aquatic life, increases in pH from acid mine drainage, and permanent hardness of water.

Increased tourism has led to an increased presence of humans in the park, which some worry could threaten the long-term survival of the park's larger mammals. To help combat the threat of over-exposure, many agencies and other groups (including Conservation International, The Nature Conservancy, WWF–U.S., rain-forest conservation groups in several countries, Catholic Relief Service, Organization of American States, and the Costa Rican, Danish, Dutch, Swedish and United States governments) have come together to provide aid to the conservation of mammalian species.

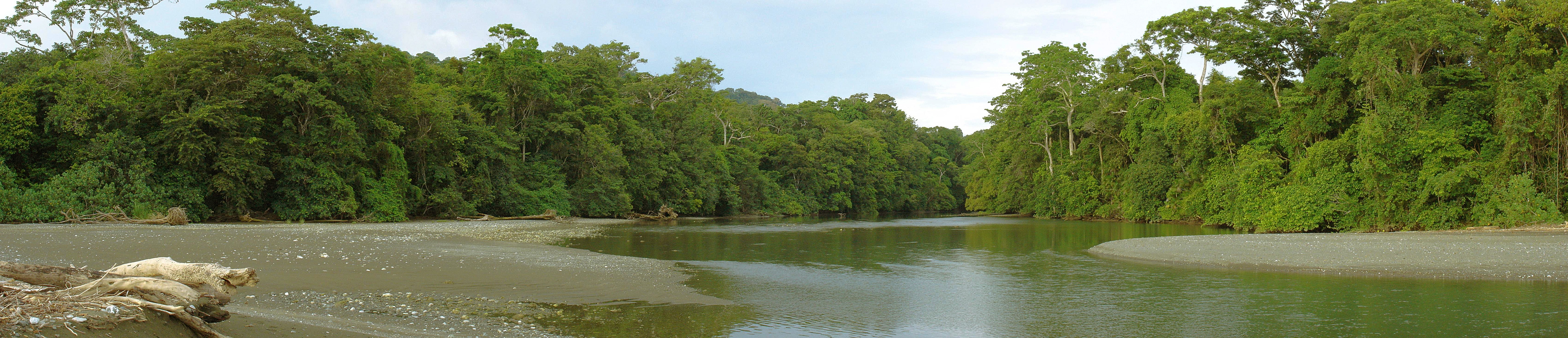
Claro River exiting the park.

== Conservation efforts ==
Despite the negative effects of environmental degradation happening in Corcovado National Park, there is a large group effort being made by conservation organizations and the government to protect and conserve the park's environment. However, efforts can be made to be reflective of both the conservation of the terrestrial and aquatic ecosystems and the local communities. Community outreach programs should help facilitate better community relationships between national parks and local communities. This can help figure out where communities can be supported better while still maintaining the purpose of protecting the national park. The government has helped enforce the various conservation laws by increasing park ranger presence in the national park. The government has also helped to promote reforestation efforts by requiring land development companies to agree to plant more trees in response to deforestation.

The Global Conservation Organization has partnered with the Osa Conservation Organization to eliminate illegal gold mining and wildlife poaching in the national park. Global Conservation is supporting Osa Conservation in their work to assist various government agencies such as the Sistema Nacional de Areas de Conservacion Costa Rica (SINAC) and the Ministerio de Ambiente y Energia (MINAE) in park protection. Since 2019, the Global Conservation Organization has funded global park defense systems to improve the efficiency of park rangers and government agencies against illegal hunters, illegal loggers, and illegal miners. These systems were designed to include new equipment and training to use new technology and methodology. The Osa Conservation and Global Conservation organizations have invested in: "• Threat Assessment - using expert analysis and reporting • Aerial Surveillance - using UAV Drones and light aircraft • Ground Surveillance – River Inspection teams to locate and geo-reference illegal gold mining activities within the park • Cellular Trail cams – Camera monitoring of roads, trails, and rivers • Identification of Violators - establishing an enforcement database of who is doing illegal mining and wildlife poaching within the park • Detailed Mapping - of locations of illegal activities within the park for targeting joint police and park ranger patrols."

One organization that is invested in conserving the biodiversity of the marine ecosystem, specifically sea turtles, is the Comunidad Protectora de Tortugas de Osa (COPROT). Their campus is located along the beachfront of a small town known as Puerto Jiminez. Founded in 2018, this grassroots conservation group is composed of environmental researchers, volunteers, activists, and even locals who are committed to protecting the nesting sites of sea turtles. Some of the local recruits were people from the gold mining community who were looking for more profitable work. The essence of their mission is to educate and provide economic opportunities to their local community and to protect endangered sea turtles.

== Tourism ==
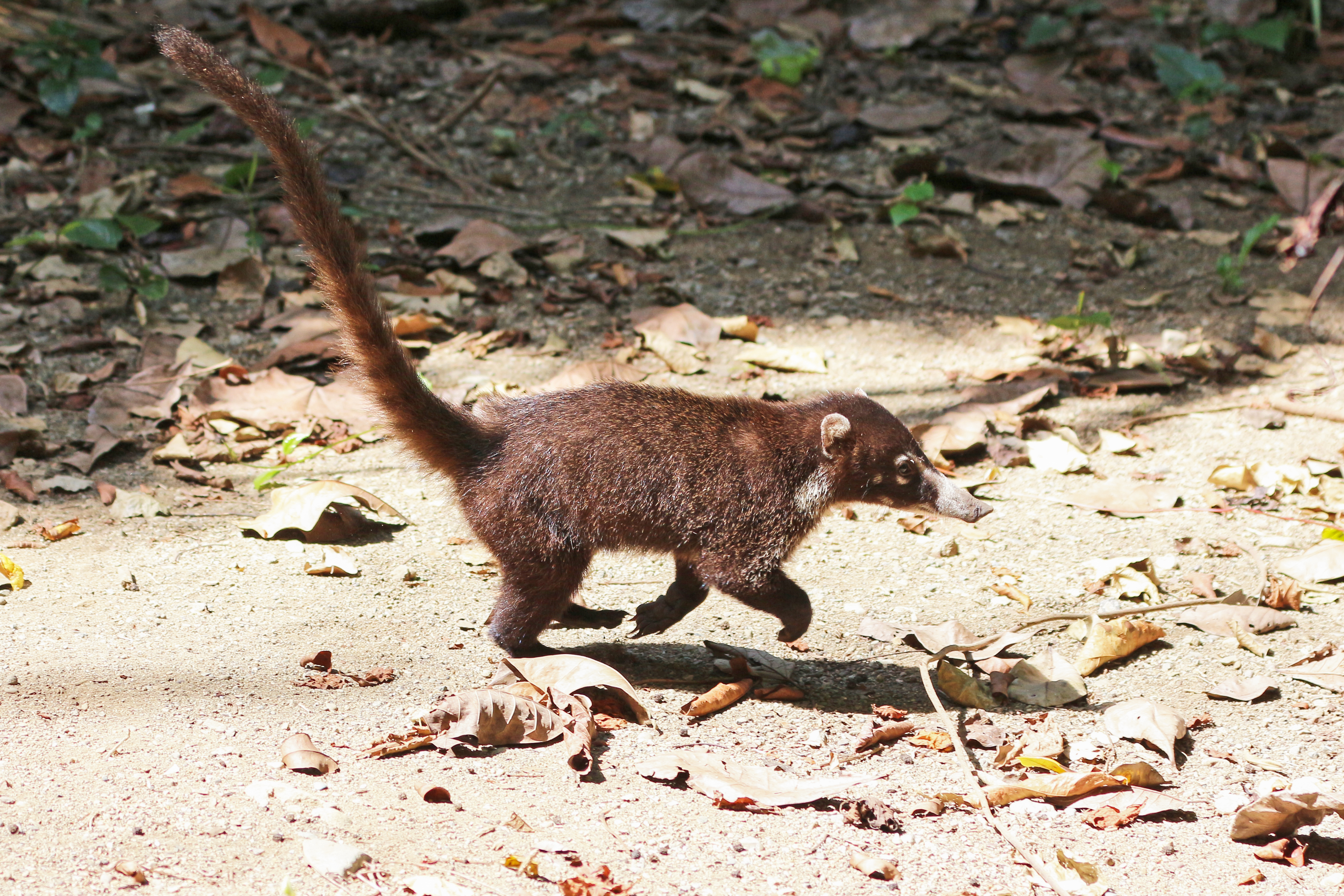
White-nosed coati

Corcovado National Park is open to the public. As of February 1, 2014 all Corcovado visitors must be accompanied by certified guides. During the wet months (July to November), certain parts of the park are closed.

There are two tracks, one coastal and one inland, and four ranger stations in the park where tourists stay overnight; three at the park entrances and one at the intersection of the two tracks. One track runs Northwest to Southeast along the coast to La Leona ecolodge, with the Estación Sirena roughly in the middle. The second track runs inland from Estación Sirena to Estación Los Patos at the Eastern end of the park.

The coastal track has several rivers that must be crossed by fording, but it's risky during high tide or for inexperienced hikers. Rio Sirena is commonly regarded as the most dangerous of crossings, primarily because it flows directly into the massive Laguna Corcovado in the isolated heart of the park. Bull sharks are present at the river mouth during high tide. American crocodiles are also present within the river. Spectacled caiman are present further up river and within Laguna Corcovado in larger numbers. The Rio Claro, which is approximately 40 minutes south of Rio Sirena, is said to be safer. Small American crocodiles and spectacled caiman are also present within the Rio Claro. The Rio Madrigal, north of the park entrance, is smaller and may be home to spectacled caiman.
