= Manuel Antonio National Park =

National park in Costa Rica

- IUCN category II (national park)
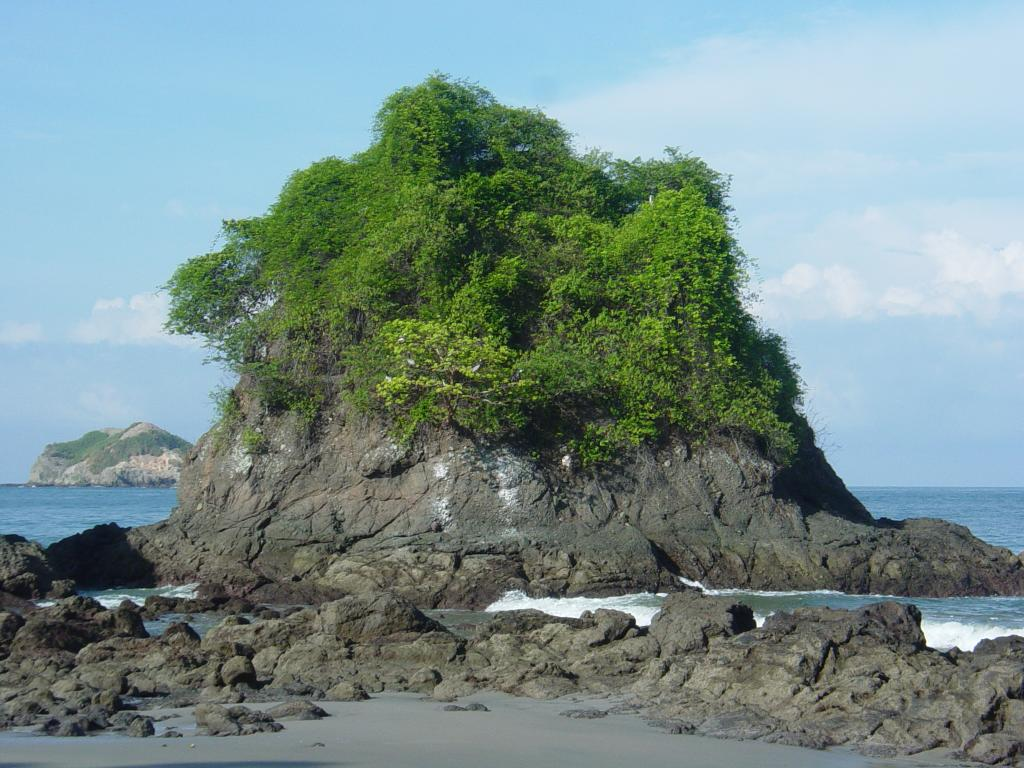
- Coastal formation in Manuel Antonio National Park
- Manuel Antonio National Park area.
- Location: Costa Rica
- Nearest city: Quepos
- Coordinates: 9°22′32″N 84°08′09″W
- Area: 1,983 ha (7.66 sq mi)
- Established: 1972
- Governing body: National System of Conservation Areas (SINAC)
- Location in Costa Rica

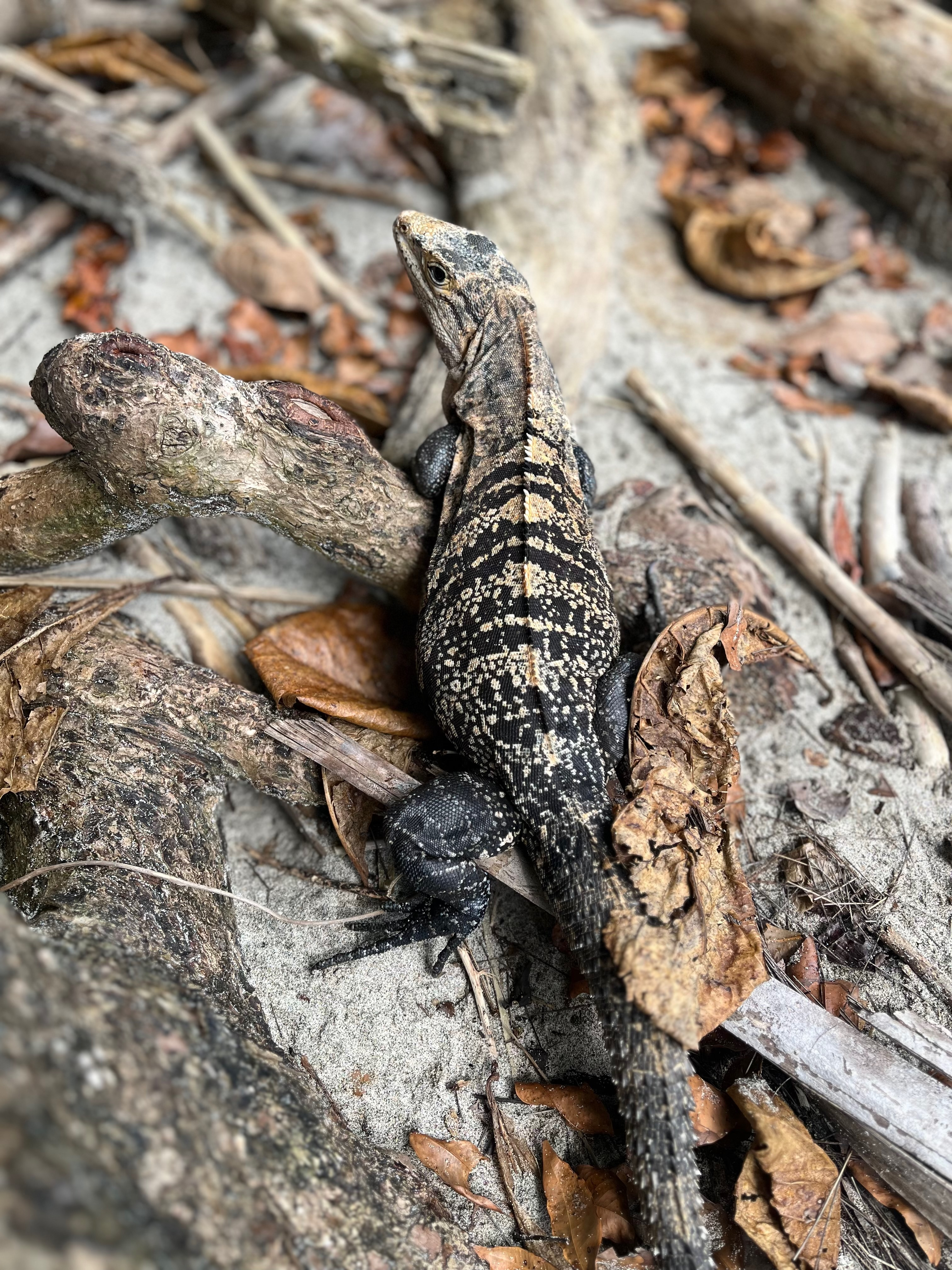
A female black spiny-tailed iguana, commonly found on its beaches

Manuel Antonio National Park (Spanish: Parque Nacional Manuel Antonio) is a small national park in the Central Pacific Conservation Area located on the Pacific coast of Costa Rica, just south of the city of Quepos, Puntarenas, and 157 km (98 mi) from the national capital of San José. It was established in 1972, when the local community sought to conserve the natural environment by prohibiting development and destruction. They also protested the beach restrictions imposed by foreign owners on locals. The park has a land area of 1,983 ha (4,900 acres) and 25,634 ha (63,340 acres) of water area for a total of 27,587 ha (68,170 acres). Despite being one of the smaller Costa Rican parks in terms of land area, Manuel Antonio is the most popular of the 30 national parks, attracting 4,388,460 visitors from 2012 to 2022.

In 2011, Manuel Antonio was listed by Forbes as among the world's 12 most beautiful national parks. The park is known for its beaches, rocky islands, hiking trails, tropical forests, and a diversity of wildlife.

== Features of the park ==
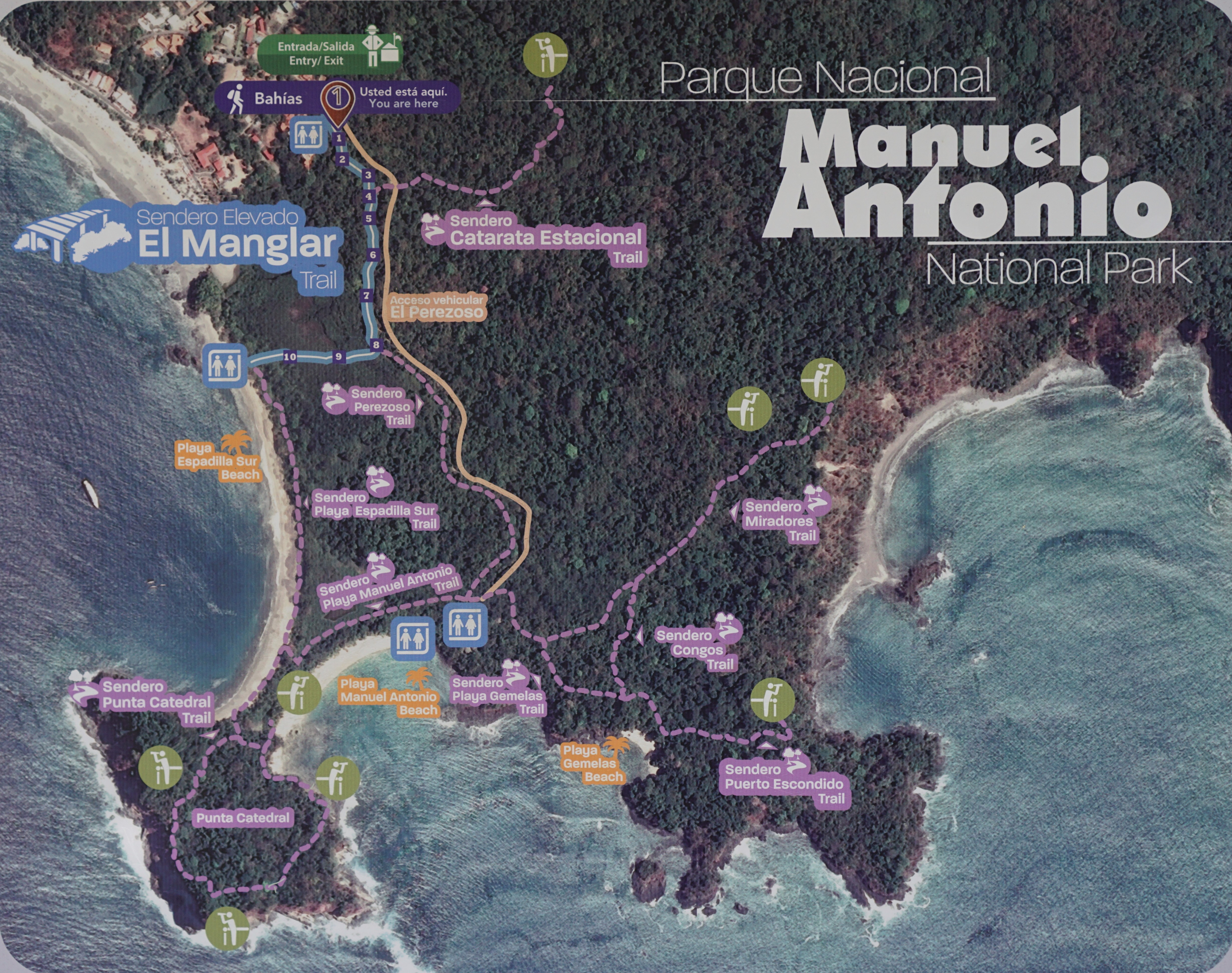
Trail Map of Manuel Antonio National Park

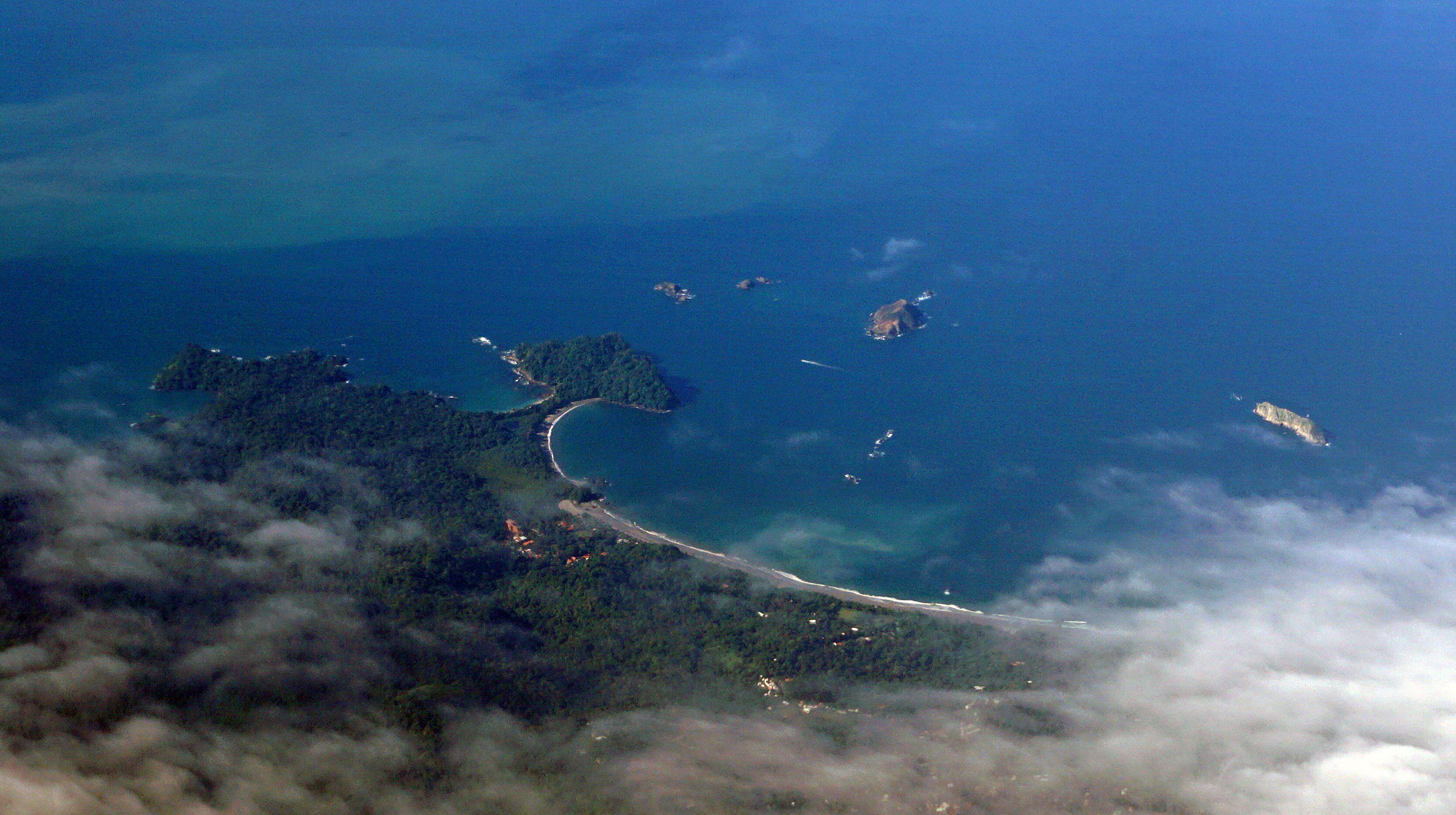
Aerial view of Manuel Antonio National Park

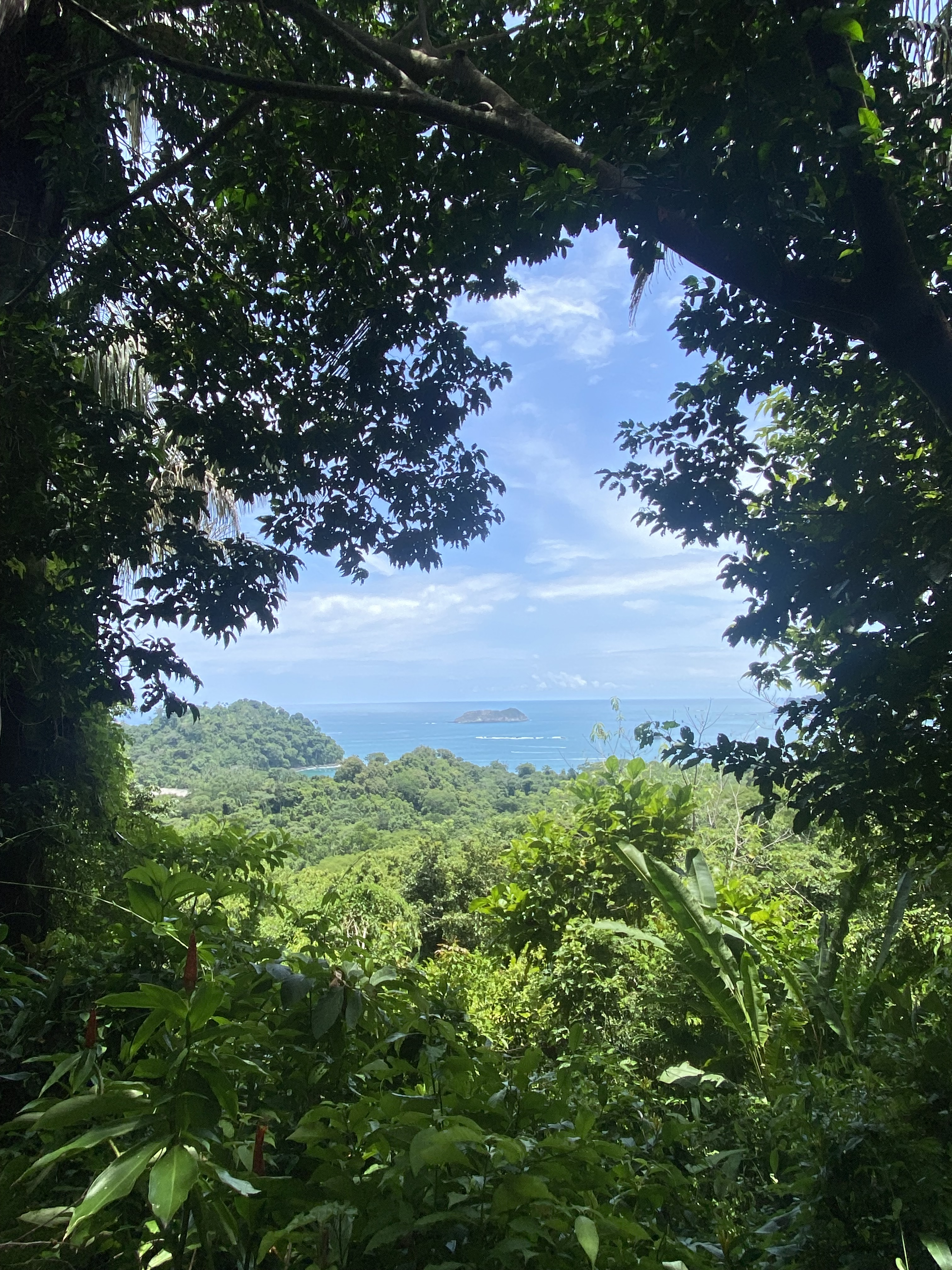
Mirador de Punta Serrucho Manuel Antonio National Park

Known for its climate and scenery, the park attracts many local and international tourists. The park is currently developing adequate infrastructure to support visitors, with an emphasis on harmony with nature to reduce visual impact and to follow strict environmental protection standards. Some buildings have been designed by the bioclimatic architects Ibo Bonilla and Rafael Víquez, including the Visitor Centre and the Casa de Guarda Parques. The park is also crossed by a network of trails equipped with universal accessibility facilities, rest areas, and scenic overlooks.

The trails are adapted for people in wheelchairs.

== Beaches ==
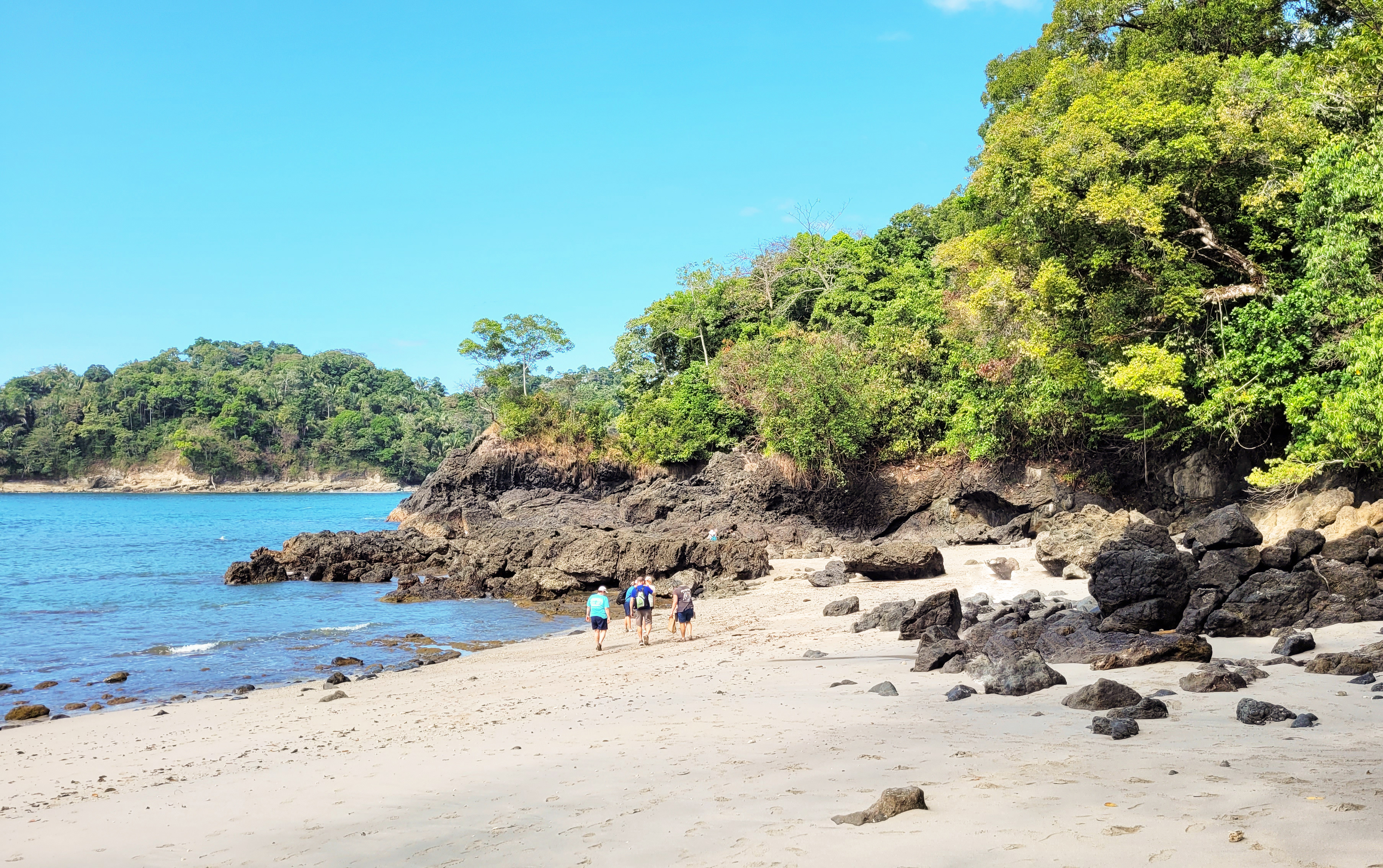
One of the park's beaches

Four beaches are contained within the limits of the park: Manuel Antonio, Espadilla Sur, Tesoro, and Playita. The first is separated from the second by a tombolo, or natural land bridge formed by sand accumulations. It is a roughly hour-long hike from Espadilla to the top of Punta Catedral (100 m). Both Manuel Antonio and Espadilla Sur have tidal pools and offer opportunities for snorkeling.

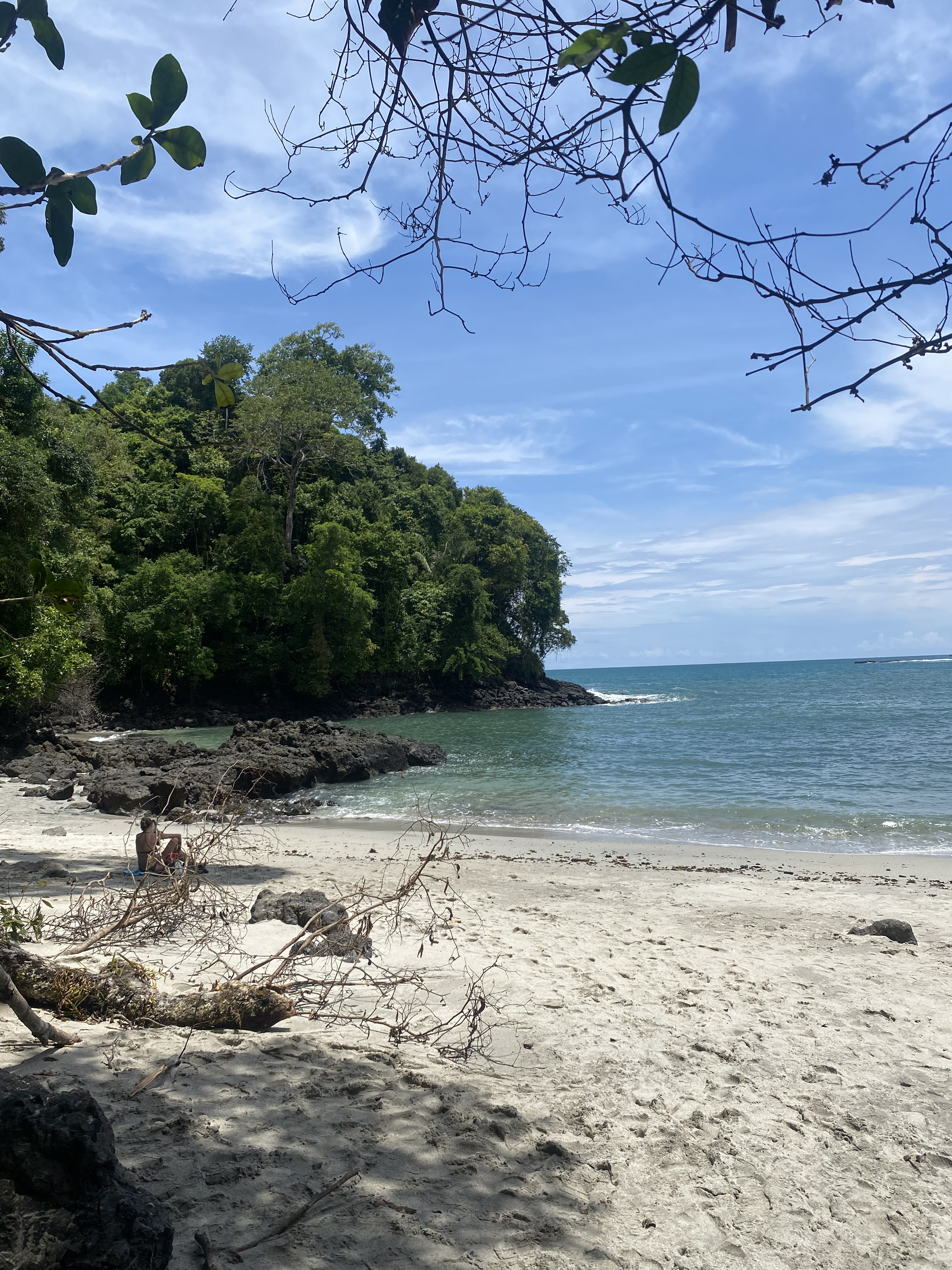
Puerto Escondido Beach

There is a lifeguard program, but precautions must be taken, as rip currents do occur.

== Biodiversity ==
Although the land area of Manuel Antonio National Park is small, the diversity of wildlife in its 19.83 km^{2} (7.66 sq mi) area totals 109 species of mammals and 184 species of birds. Both brown-throated three-toed sloth and Hoffmann's two-toed sloth are a major feature, as are three of Costa Rica's four monkey species — the mantled howler monkey, Central American squirrel monkey, and Panamanian white-faced capuchin monkey. The Central American squirrel monkey is classified as Endangered on the IUCN Red List, with a decreasing population trend. Other species found in the park include black spiny-tailed iguana, green iguana, common basilisk, white-nosed coati and many snake and bat species. Included in the 184 bird species are toucans, woodpeckers, potoos, motmots, tanagers, turkey vulture, parakeets and hawks. Dolphins can be observed there, as well as the occasional migrating whale. Scuba diving, snorkeling, sea kayaking, mountain biking, and hiking provide opportunities to experience the tropical wildlife that enriches Manuel Antonio.

Manuel Antonio was previously Costa Rica's second-most-visited park, behind Poás Volcano National Park, which lies very close to San José, the country's largest urban area. However, due to recent eruptions, Poás Volcano is closed indefinitely, making Manuel Antonio the most visited national park in Costa Rica.

== Access ==
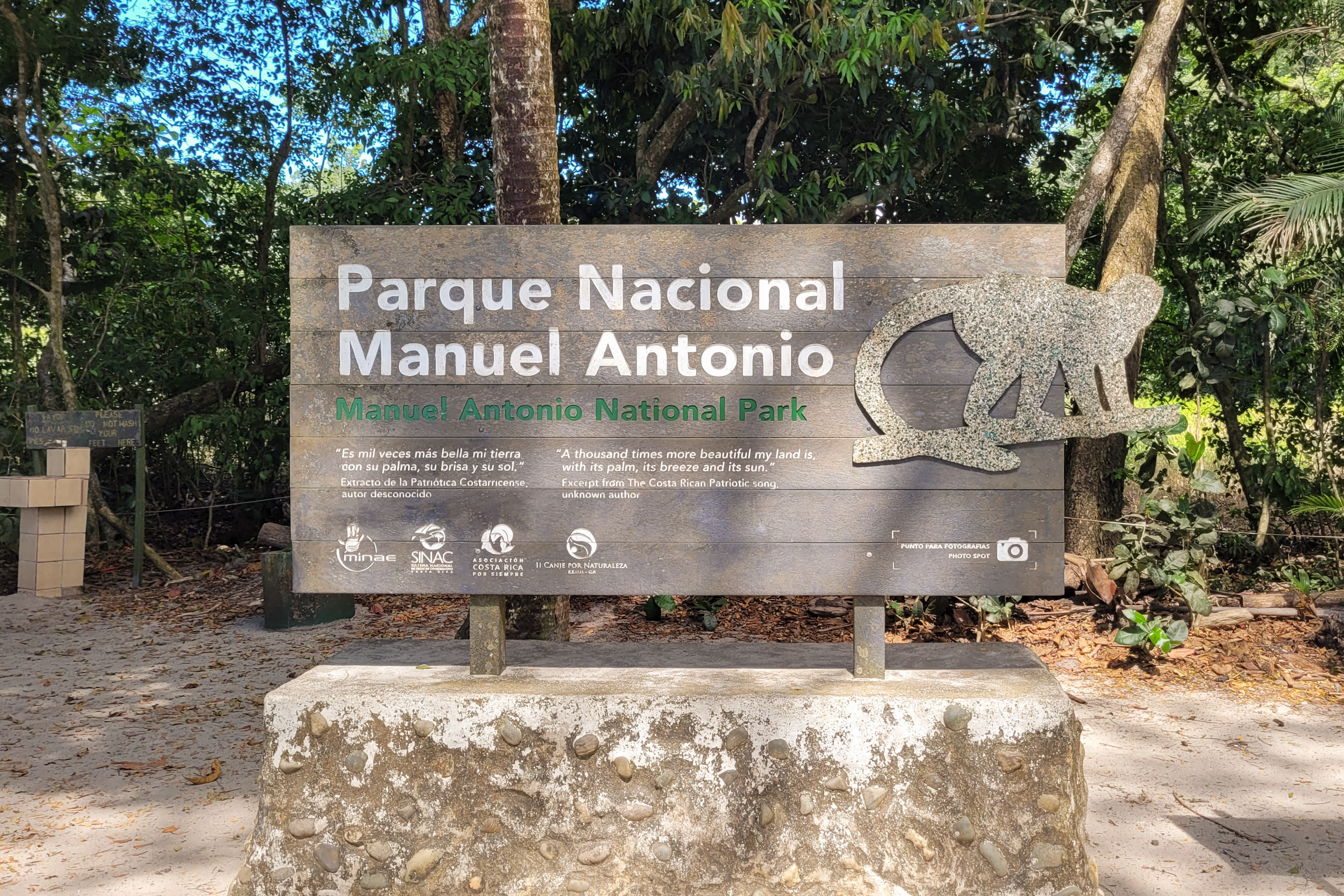
Entrance of the park

The main access road route is through Route 618 from Quepos.

The park is open every day except Tuesdays. They are also open for holidays like Christmas, New Year's, and Easter; if the holiday falls on a Tuesday, it will be closed for that day.

As of May 4, 2021, SINAC is the sole seller of park admissions. Tickets can only be bought online and with a valid form of ID.

== See also ==
- List of national parks of Costa Rica
- Tourism in Costa Rica
