= Tourism in Costa Rica =

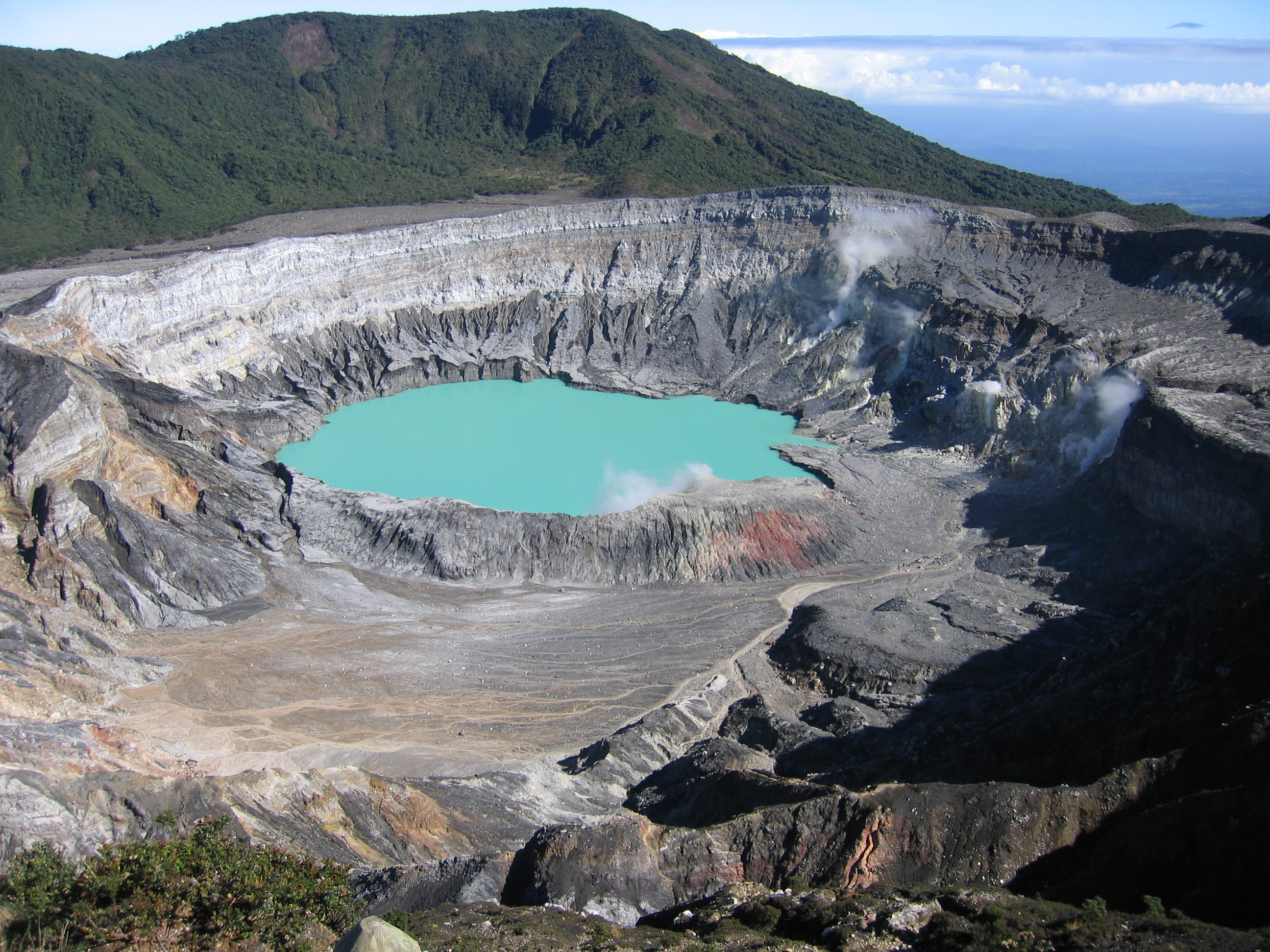
Poás Volcano Crater is one of Costa Rica's main tourist attractions.

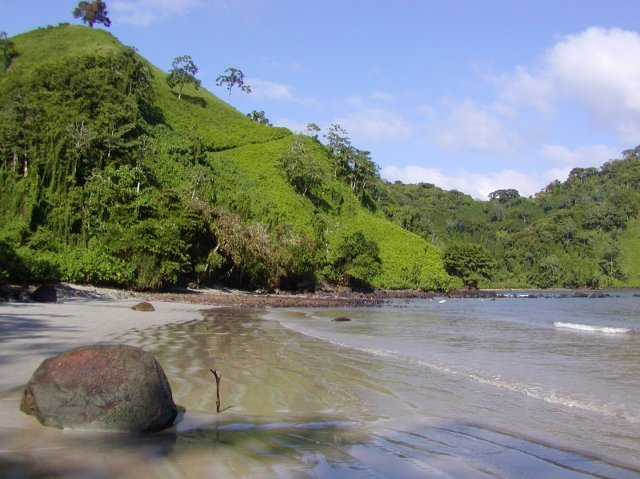
Cocos Island is a prime ecotourism destination. A World Heritage Site, ranked among the top 77 nominees for the world's New 7 Wonders of Nature.

Tourism in Costa Rica has been one of the fastest growing economic sectors of the country and by 1995 became the largest foreign exchange earner. Since 1999, tourism has earned more foreign exchange than bananas, pineapples and coffee exports combined. The tourism boom began in 1987, with the number of visitors up from 329,000 in 1988, through 1.03 million in 1999, over 2 million in 2008, to a historical record of 2.66 million foreign visitors in 2015. In 2012, tourism contributed with 12.5% of the country's GDP and it was responsible for 11.7% of direct and indirect employment. In 2009, tourism attracted 17% of foreign direct investment inflows, and 13% in average between 2000 and 2009. In 2010, the tourism industry was responsible for 21.2% of foreign exchange generated by all exports. According to a 2007 report by ECLAC, tourism contributed to a reduction in poverty of 3% in the country.

Since the late 1980s, Costa Rica became a popular nature travel destination, and its main competitive advantage is its well-established system of national parks and protected areas, covering around 23.4% of the country's land area, the largest in the world as a percentage of the country's territory, and home to a rich variety of flora and fauna, in a country that has only 0.03% of the world's landmass, but that is estimated to contain 5% of the world's biodiversity. The country also has plenty of beaches, both in the Pacific Ocean and the Caribbean Sea, within short travel distances, and also several volcanoes that can be visited with safety. By the early 1990s, Costa Rica became known as the poster child of ecotourism, with tourist arrivals reaching an average annual growth rate of 14% between 1986 and 1994.

According to the Costa Rican Tourism Board, 47% of international tourists visiting the country in 2009 engaged in activities related to ecotourism, which includes trekking, flora, fauna, and bird watching, and visits to rural communities. However, most visitors look for adventure activities.

== Description and key statistics ==
Yearly tourist arrivals in millions

Costa Rica stands as the most visited nation in the Central American region, with 3.14 million foreign visitors in 2019. During the same year, El Salvador was ranked second in the region with 1.77 million, followed by Panama and Guatemala with 1.75 million visitors each.

The number of tourists visiting Costa Rica surpassed the 2 million milestone in 2008, and tourist-related income reached US$2.1 billion that year. As a result of the Great Recession, international arrivals began falling since August 2008, as the number of U.S. citizens visiting the country shrank, and this market segment represented 54% of all foreign tourists visiting Costa Rica.

International tourist arrivals 1988–2019
Year	Arrivals (×1000)	Year	Arrivals (×1000)	Year	Arrivals (×1000)	Receipts USD million	Year	Arrivals (×1000)	Receipts USD million
1988	329	1996	781	2004	1,453	1,358	2012	2,343	2,313
1989	376	1997	811	2005	1,679	1,570	2013	2,428	2,665
1990	435	1998	943	2006	1,725	1,732	2014	2,527	2,864
1991	504	1999	1,032	2007	1,973	1,974	2015	2,660	2,882
1992	611	2000	1,088	2008	2,089	2,144	2016	2,925	3,716
1993	684	2001	1,131	2009	1,923	2,075	2017	2,960	3,876
1994	762	2002	1,113	2010	2,100	1,999	2018	3,017	3,773
1995	785	2003	1,239	2011	2,192	2,152	2019	3,139	4,010

The combined effect of the global economic crisis and the 2009 flu pandemic resulted in a reduction of tourists arrivals in 2009 to 1.9 million visitors, an 8% reduction as compared to 2008. In 2010, the number of visitors rose to 2.1 million, barely exceeding the 2008 peak, and a record was reached in 2012 with 2.34 million visitors, a 6.9% increase over 2011.

A historical record of 2.5 million international visitors arrived in the country in 2014, up 4.1% year-on-year, and the corresponding receipts rose to US$2.636 billion in 2014, up 8.3% from the previous year. In addition, the average expenditure per tourist increased from US$1,171 in 2010 to US$1,431 in 2014, and the average stay increased from 11 days in 2010 to 13.4 in 2014. Costa Rica achieved new records in 2016 with 2.93 million visitors and total earnings of US$3.716 billion. The country finally reached the 3 million tourists' milestone in 2018.

In terms of the 2017 Travel and Tourism Competitiveness Index (TTCI), Costa Rica reached the 38th place in the world ranking, classified as the fourth most competitive among Latin American countries after Mexico (22), Brazil (27) and Panama (35), and ranking sixth in the Americas. Just considering the subindex measuring natural resources, Costa Rica ranks in the 3rd place at a worldwide level, 21st in the world when considering international openness criteria, and 24th worldwide when considering the subindex measuring prioritization of travel and tourism. The 2017 TTCI report also notes Costa Rica's main weaknesses are price competitiveness (108th) and ground and port infrastructure (99th), with quality of the roads ranking 123rd and ground transport efficiency 108th between 138 countries analyzed.

In 2012, most visitors came from the United States (39.3%), Nicaragua (20.2%), Canada (6.5%), Panama (3.9%), and Mexico (2.9%). Tourists from North America and European countries made up 60.8% of all international visitors, and visitors from Central America represented 30.8%. According to a 2006 survey, visitors from the Caribbean Basin and South America travel to Costa Rica mainly for business or professional purposes, while a majority of Americans, Canadians and Europeans visit the country for leisure. Word of mouth from friends and family, with an average of 58%, was the leading reason for visiting Costa Rica for vacations and leisure. The main visitor's complaint is the poor condition of the roads.

Top 30 visitor arrivals by country of origin in 2018
Ranking	Country of origin	Visitor arrivals 2018	% Yearly growth	Ranking	Country of origin	Visitor arrivals 2018	% Yearly growth
1	United States	1,265,067	5.5	16	Netherlands	32,561	7.4
2	Nicaragua	416,915	-3.0	17	Italy	29,171	0.4
3	Canada	217,006	7.5	18	Switzerland	28,884	13.7
4	Mexico	98,918	-7.4	19	Brazil	22,329	3.9
5	Panama	92,802	-11.4	20	Chile	18,297	35.5
6	El Salvador	76,937	-5.1	21	China	15,249	12.0
7	Germany	74,574	5.1	22	Peru	14,865	12.1
8	United Kingdom	74,338	-2.4	23	Israel	14,359	-1.3
9	France	74,032	6.1	24	Belgium	12,381	0.9
10	Spain	68,634	-1.2	25	Australia	11,159	-9.4
11	Guatemala	65,633	-15.9	26	Sweden	11,117	11.3
12	Colombia	46,723	-2.6	27	India	8,236	11.1
13	Argentina	40,832	31.8	28	Austria	8,089	5.2
14	Honduras	38,135	-5.4	29	Denmark	6,574	7.4
15	Venezuela	33,197	-17.6	30	Japan	6,460	8.5
Visitor arrivals by region of origin in 2018 (Top 4)
1	North America	1,580,991	4.8	3	Europe	480,102	3.9
2	Central America	691,386	-6.0	4	South America	190,413	5.0

Tourists in Costa Rica by Nationality (2020–2024)
Rank	Country	2024	2023	2022	2021	2020
1	United States	1,621,340	1,473,620	1,290,038	868,986	434,775
2	Canada	272,256	260,744	183,678	53,185	115,632
3	Mexico	96,129	85,674	59,786	36,621	20,603
4	Nicaragua	95,799	94,083	78,473	27,634	123,956
5	Germany	86,571	91,511	79,701	34,700	28,821
6	France	76,685	74,484	65,411	32,199	35,267
7	United Kingdom	74,647	77,376	77,810	18,048	24,623
8	Spain	59,201	59,242	58,376	41,857	14,801
9	Guatemala	45,567	43,075	30,991	15,638	18,549
10	Netherlands	36,638	37,464	34,518	10,784	10,421
11	Colombia	31,361	29,267	25,547	14,919	11,254
12	Argentina	28,736	28,564	20,476	8,868	10,571
13	El Salvador	28,258	31,849	28,173	12,300	10,571
14	Switzerland	26,541	29,429	29,766	21,643	20,898
15	Italy	21,832	21,391	18,089	9,061	8,936
16	Brazil	21,484	21,249	15,878	11,864	6,466
17	Chile	19,340	20,164	15,317	5,200	6,487
18	Honduras	18,710	20,505	18,733	7,436	10,171
19	Peru	15,852	17,179	17,163	5,996	4,029
20	India	14,575	11,153	6,997	2,925	2,146
—	Others	227,961	223,111	194,616	141,544	92,935
—	Total	2,919,483	2,751,134	2,349,537	1,347,055	1,011,912

== Comparative performance in the Latin American market ==
The following table presents a comparison of Costa Rica's tourism industry performance with selected countries from the Caribbean Basin and South America, including Bahamas, Cuba, and several of the top ten Latin American countries according to their 2013 Travel and Tourism Competitiveness Index (TTCI), which are competitors in the nature travel market segment.

Selected Caribbean and Latin American countries	International tourist arrivals 2012 (×1000)	International tourism receipts 2012 (million USD)	Receipts per arrival 2012 (col 2)/(col 1) (USD)	Arrivals per capita per 1000 pop. (estimated) 2007	Receipts per capita 2005 USD	Revenues as % of exports goods and services 2003	Tourism revenues as % GDP 2012	% Direct & indirect employment in tourism 2012	World Ranking Tourism Compet. TTCI 2013	Index value TTCI 2013
Bahamas^{(1)}	1,419	2,367	1,668	4,616	6,288	74.6	34.1	68.7	n/d	n/d
Barbados	536	916	1,709	1,956	2,749	58.5	42.7	41.9	27	4.88
Brazil	5,677	6,645	1,170	26	18	3.2	8.9	8.1	51	4.37
Chile	3,554	2,201	619	151	73	5.3	8.4	8.0	56	4.29
Colombia	2,175	2,351	1,081	26	25	6.6	5.1	5.5	84	3.90
Costa Rica	2,343	2,425	1,035	442	343	17.5	12.5	11.7	47	4.44
Cuba^{(1)}	2,688	2,283	849	188	169	n/d	n/d	n/d	n/d	n/d
Dominican Republic	4,563	4,549	997	408	353	36.2	14.7	13.6	86	3.88
Jamaica	1,986	2,043	1,029	628	530	49.2	25.7	23.8	67	4.08
Mexico	23,403	12,739	544	201	103	5.7	12.4	13.7	44	4.46
Panama	1,606	2,259	1,406	330	211	10.6	10.1	9.6	37	4.54
Peru	2,846	2,657	933	65	41	9.0	9.1	7.8	73	4.00
Uruguay	2,695	2,076	770	525	145	14.2	10.2	9.7	59	4.23

- Notes: Green shadow denotes the country with the top indicator. Yellow shadow corresponds to Costa Rica's.
  (1) Visitors and receipts for Cuba correspond to 2011. For Bahamas tourism revenues as % GDP are for 2003, and direct and indirect employment for 2005.

== essential COSTA RICA ==
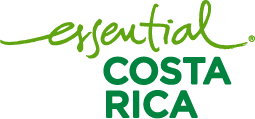
Logo of Costa Rica's Country Brand.

essential COSTA RICA is the nation branding of the Republic of Costa Rica, implemented to project the country's image in international markets. Its purpose is to promote exports, attract foreign direct investment, encourage tourism, and highlight Costa Rican culture. Additionally, it aims to foster competitiveness among national companies, improve quality standards, and generate a community of licensed companies that promote business both in Costa Rica and abroad.

The nation branding is led by an institutional council composed of the Costa Rican Foreign Trade Promoter (PROCOMER), the Costa Rican Tourism Institute (ICT), the Ministry of Foreign Trade (COMEX), the Ministry of Foreign Affairs and Worship, and the Ministry of Culture and Youth (MCJ). It was created through Executive Decree No. 37669-RE-COMEX-TUR on March 22, 2013.

Companies seeking to obtain the nation branding seal must undergo an evaluation protocol covering the brand's five values: excellence, sustainability, social progress, innovation, and Costa Rican linkage. As of 2024, 751 companies hold the essential COSTA RICA license, including 482 from the commerce sector, 269 from tourism, and 66 from foreign direct investment.

=== History ===
The 2011–2014 National Development Plan recognized the importance of sustainable tourism for the country's economic growth, highlighting Costa Rica's existing positioning as a tourist destination. Previously, the campaign "Costa Rica, No Artificial Ingredients", promoted by the Costa Rican Tourism Institute, emphasized biodiversity and sustainability as key themes for promotional campaigns.

By 2012, Costa Rica was ranked 25th globally and first in Latin America in the Nation Branding Index by Future Brand. However, the brand's focus at the time was primarily on tourism, without integrating other sectors such as investment and exports. In response to this limitation, efforts were made to develop a more comprehensive nation branding that would reflect not only tourism but also other strategic elements. In 2013, through a presidential decree, the nation branding essential COSTA RICA was officially established to represent a coherent image of the country internationally.

An Inter-Institutional Committee for the Nation Branding was also created, tasked with overseeing and coordinating promotional efforts in areas such as tourism, investment, and international trade.

==== Objectives ====
essential COSTA RICA has five main objectives:

1. Attract foreign direct investment in strategic sectors such as high-tech manufacturing and high-value-added services.
2. Promote the export of value-added products with a sense of exclusivity, distinction, and international quality.
3. Attract selective types of tourism, such as business, adventure, and sustainable tourism.
4. Promote domestic public participation on three levels: information, opinion, and decision, to achieve brand recognition and persuasion.
5. Build a Country Brand through communication anchored in the present with a consistent vision for the future.

=== Types of licenses ===
The types of licenses granted by the nation branding include:

- Corporate use: For institutional communication, websites, social media, professional materials, and physical locations. The license lasts 60 months, with an intermediate review at 30 months.
- Product use: For products, labels, and packaging. The corporate use license is required to apply.
- Tourism sector: Companies in the tourism sector must have a tourism declaration or the CST mark from the Costa Rican Tourism Institute.
- Use in events: Temporary licenses for promotional events aligning with the brand's five values.

The essential COSTA RICA license can be requested by individuals or legal entities, both national and foreign, engaged in economic activities related to tourism, attracting foreign direct investment, exports, export-oriented SMEs, companies related to foreign trade, and other areas aligned with the objectives of the Country Brand.

=== Natural intelligence strategy ===
In October 2023, the government of Costa Rica announced that over the next decade, it would enhance the brand and image of essential COSTA RICA with a focus on sustainability and the concept of "natural intelligence." The initiative aims to strengthen the country's leadership on the global stage, building on Costa Rica's existing reputation for addressing the climate crisis and environmental preservation. The new strategy is based on concrete actions the country has implemented in these areas.

"Natural intelligence" highlights several milestones in Costa Rican history, such as the abolition of the military in 1949, the establishment of free and compulsory primary education in 1869, the protection of 25.5% of its land and 30.3% of its maritime territory, becoming the first tropical country to reverse deforestation, achieving 57.1% national forest cover, generating 98.6% of its electricity from renewable sources, housing 6.5% of global biodiversity on just 0.03% of the planet's surface, being ranked "the happiest country in the world" according to the Happy Planet Index 2024, and hosting one of the world's five "Blue Zones" in Nicoya, where inhabitants enjoy longer and healthier lives.

=== Awards and recognitions ===
- 2019: "Country Brand of the Year", awarded by City Nation Place Awards, London.
- 2019: Silver Award in the Environment category, awarded by El Ojo de Iberoamérica.
- 2020: "Brand Strategy", awarded by the Place Marketing Forum, France.
- 2022: "Best Use of Design", for the redesign of the Costa Rican passport, awarded by City Nation Place Awards.

== Ecotourism ==
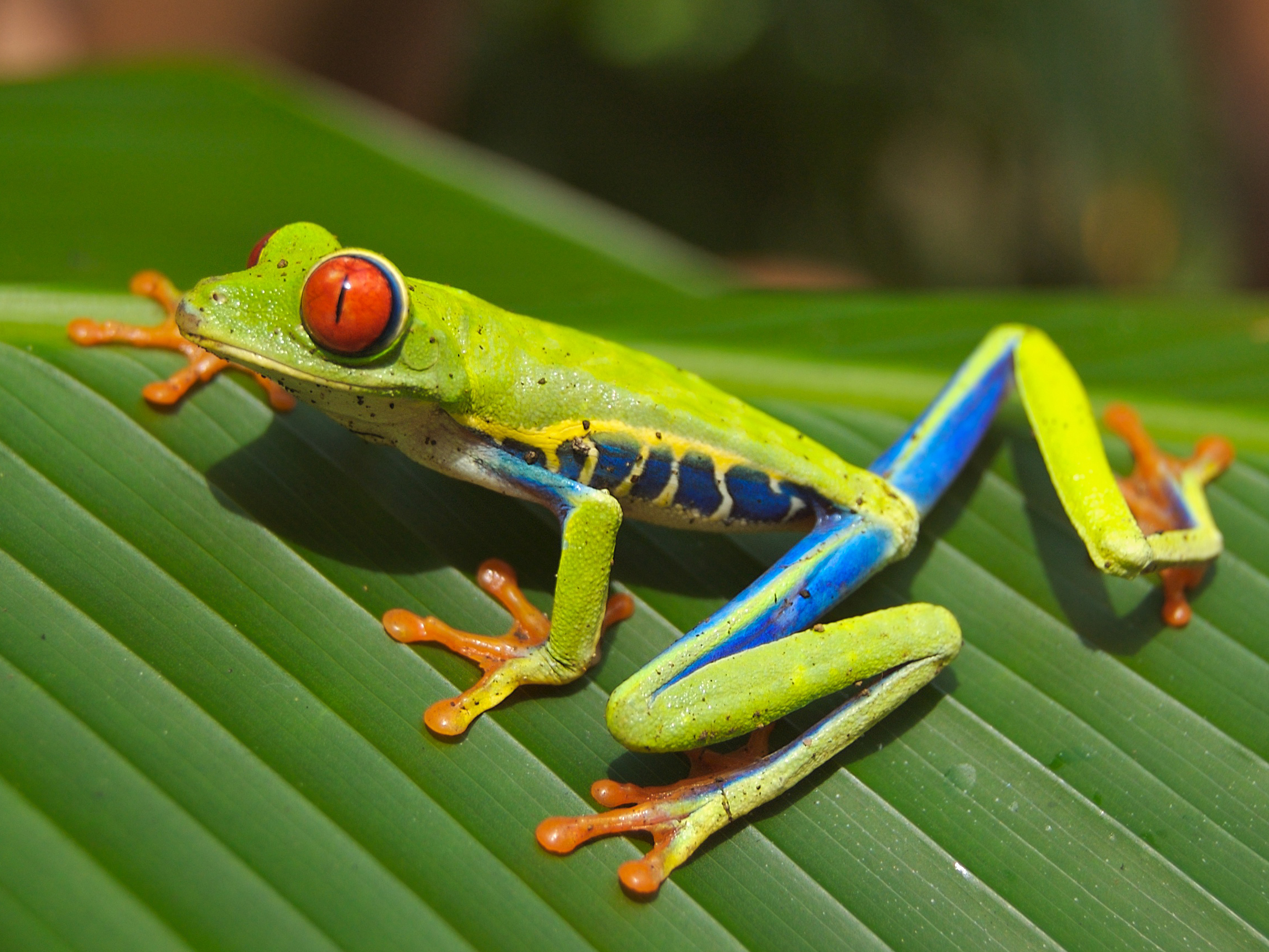
Costa Rica's biodiversity is an asset for ecotourism. Shown a notable frog species, the Red-eyed Tree Frog.

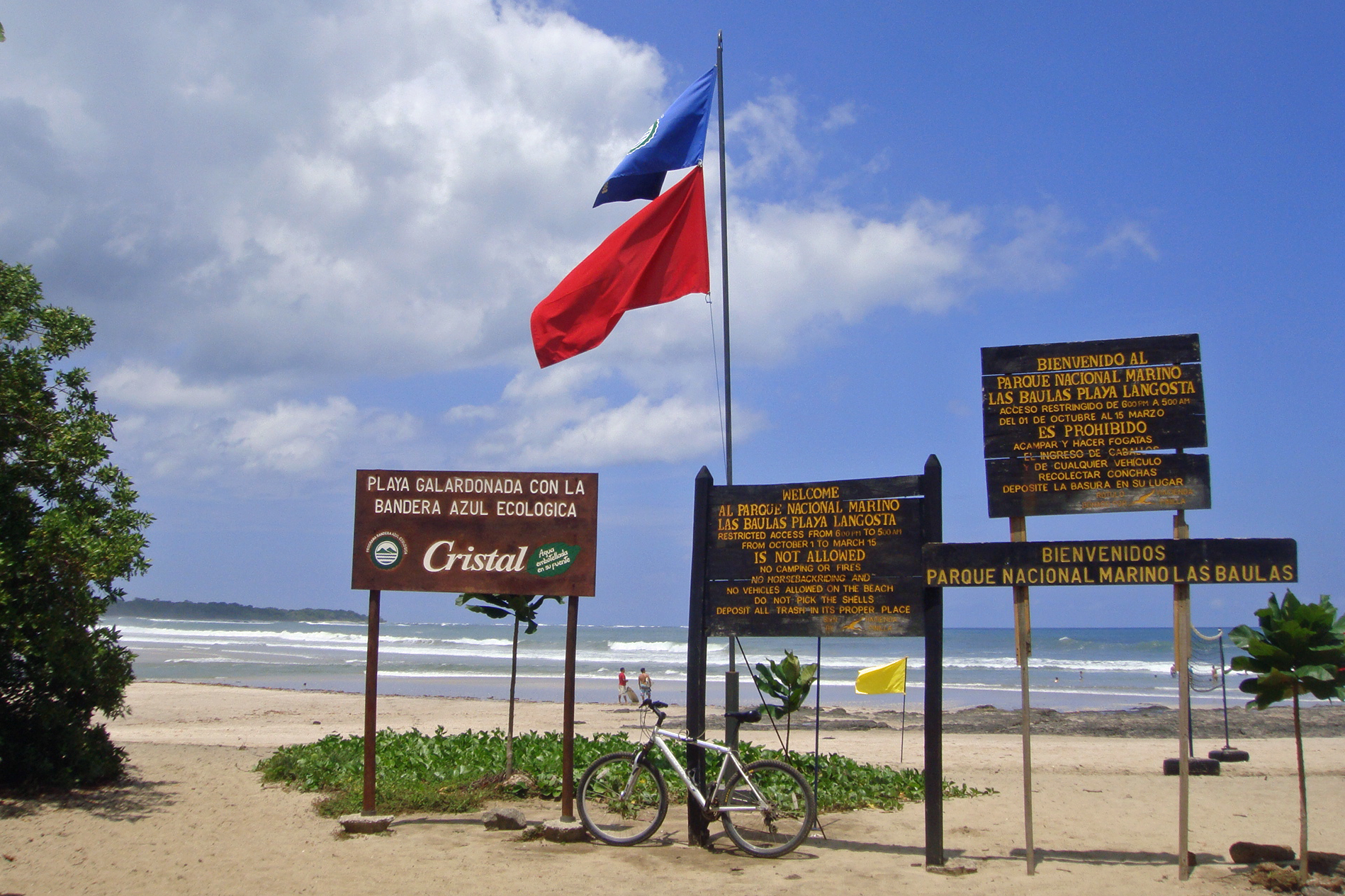
Beach sign and flag from the Bandera Azul Ecológica (Ecological Blue Flag) Program at Playa Langosta, Las Baulas National Marine Park, Guanacaste.

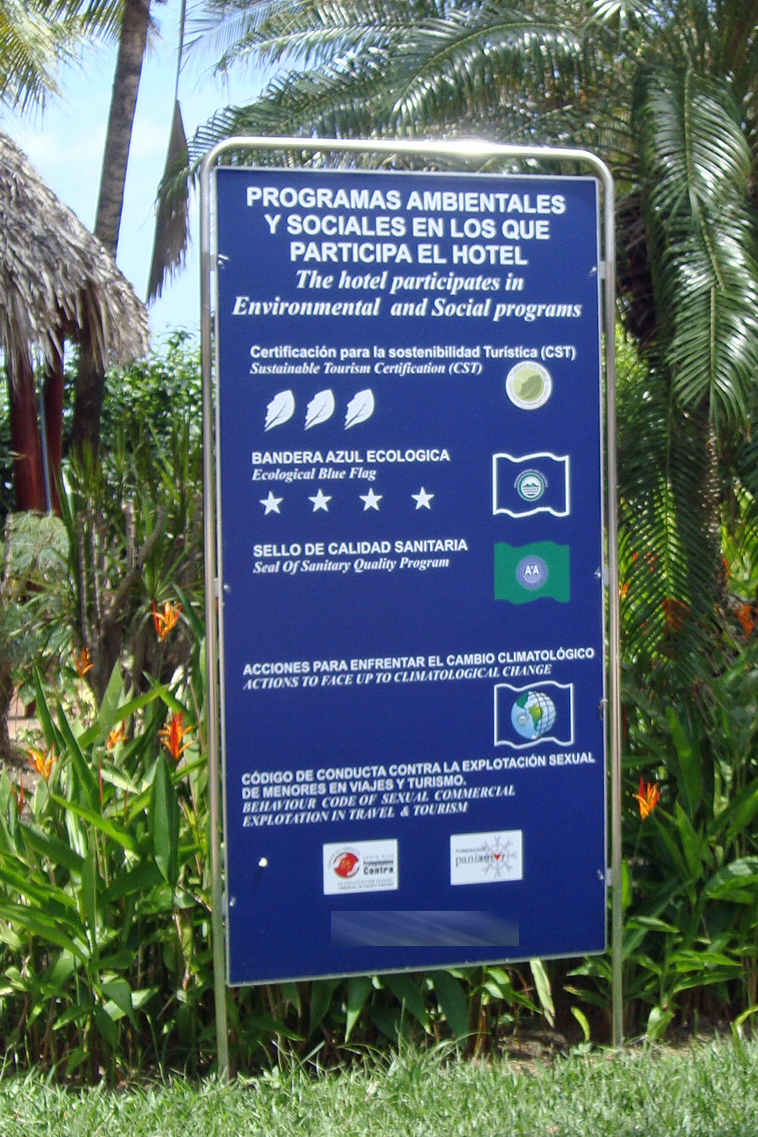
A hotel sign showing the voluntary certification programs the hotel has passed or is associated with. Shown are a four star Bandera Azul Ecológica and a three leaves CST Program.

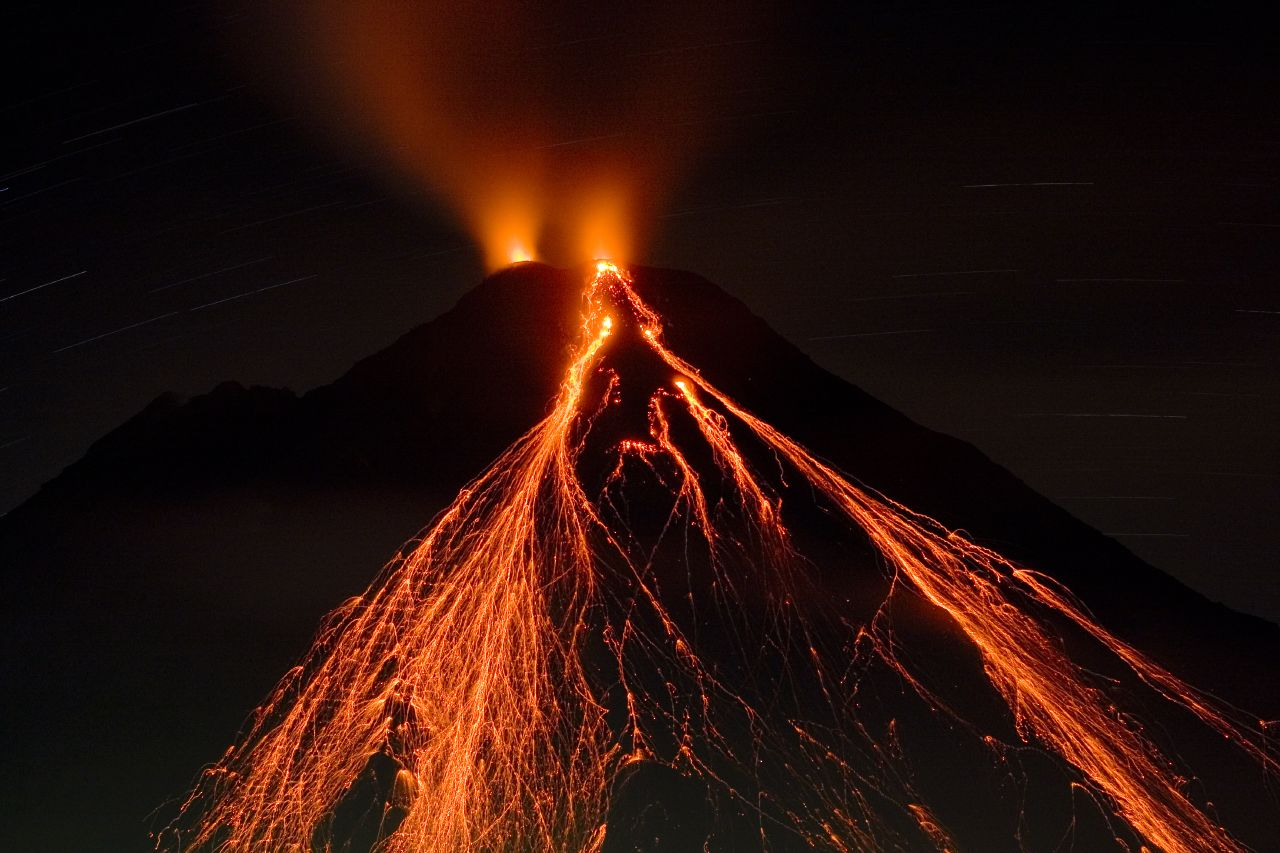
Arenal Volcano is a main destination in Costa Rica, San Carlos, Alajuela.

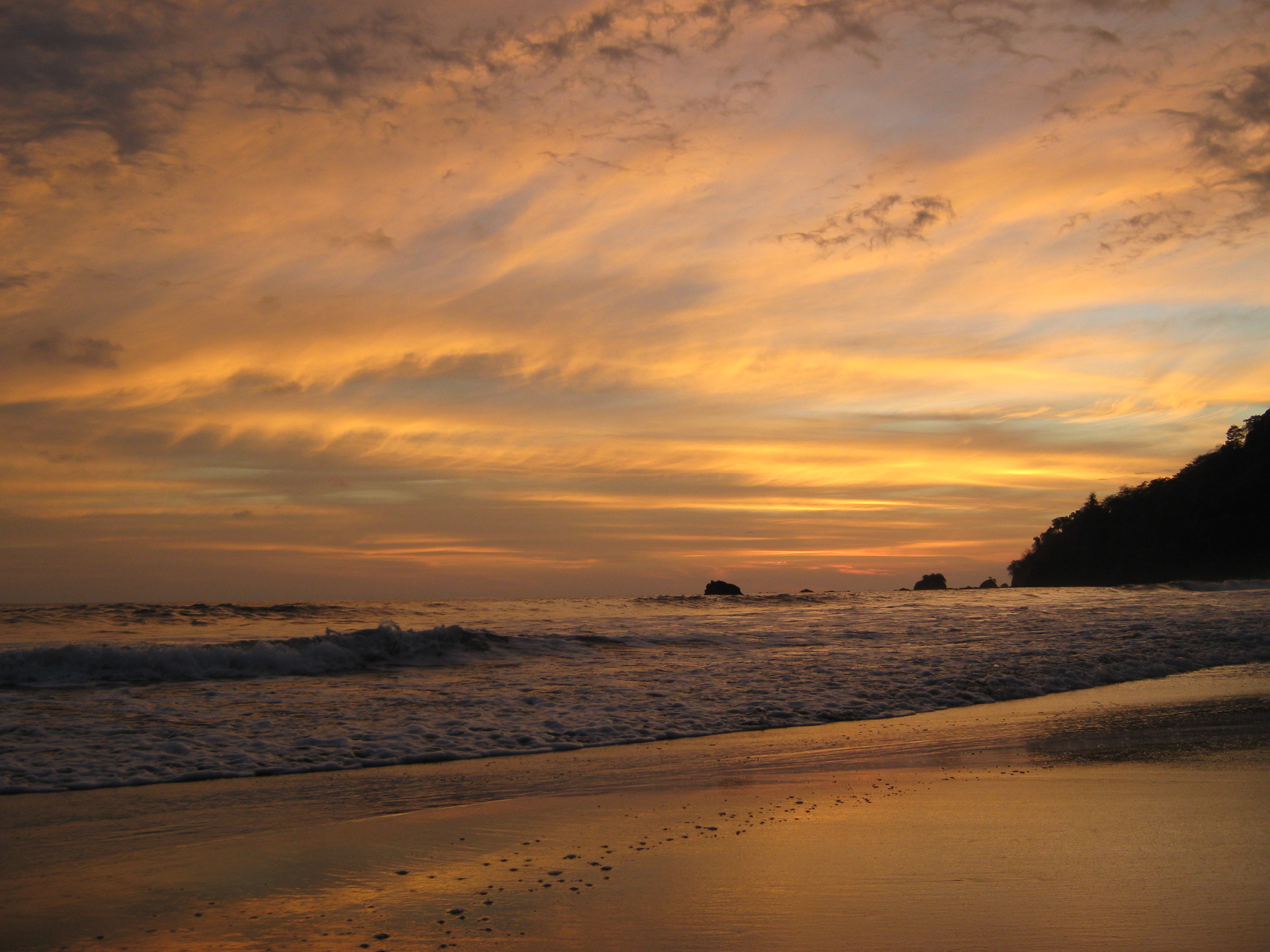
Manuel Antonio National Park is well known for its four beaches combined with sights of natural beauty, Quepos Puntarenas.

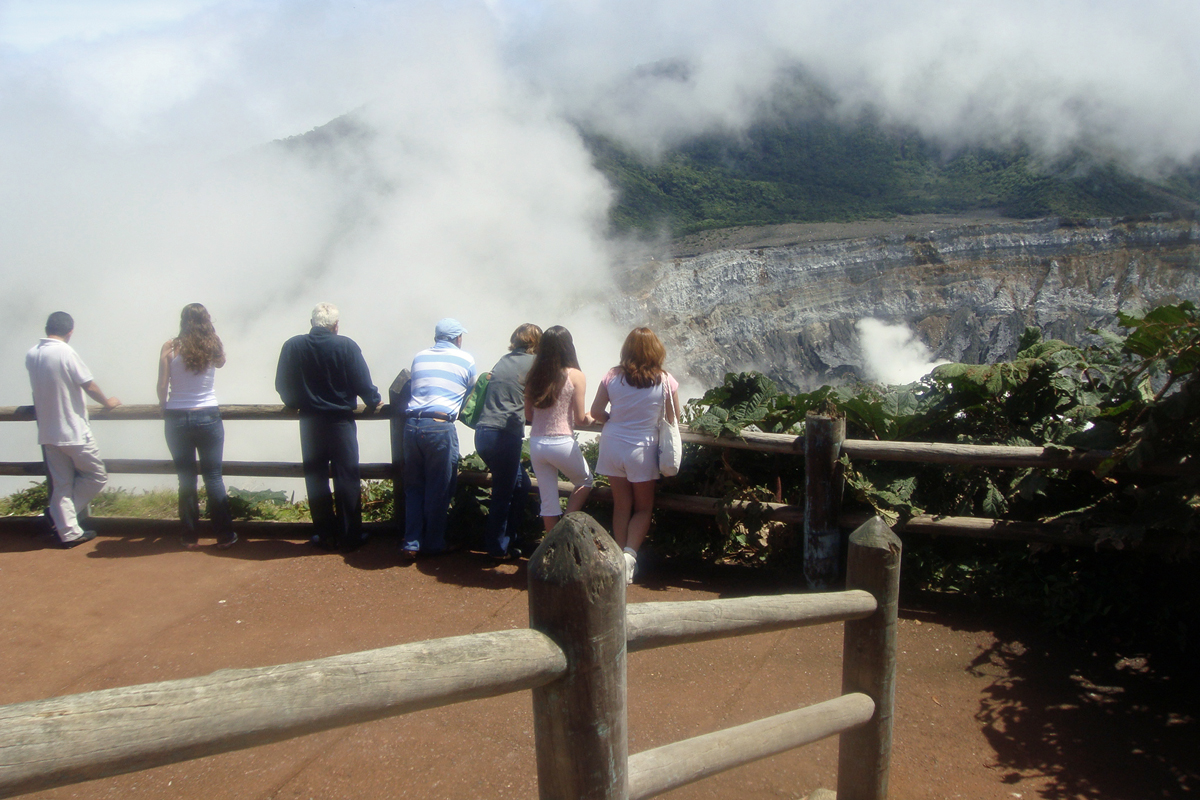
Tourists at the viewing area at the edge of the Poás Volcano crater.

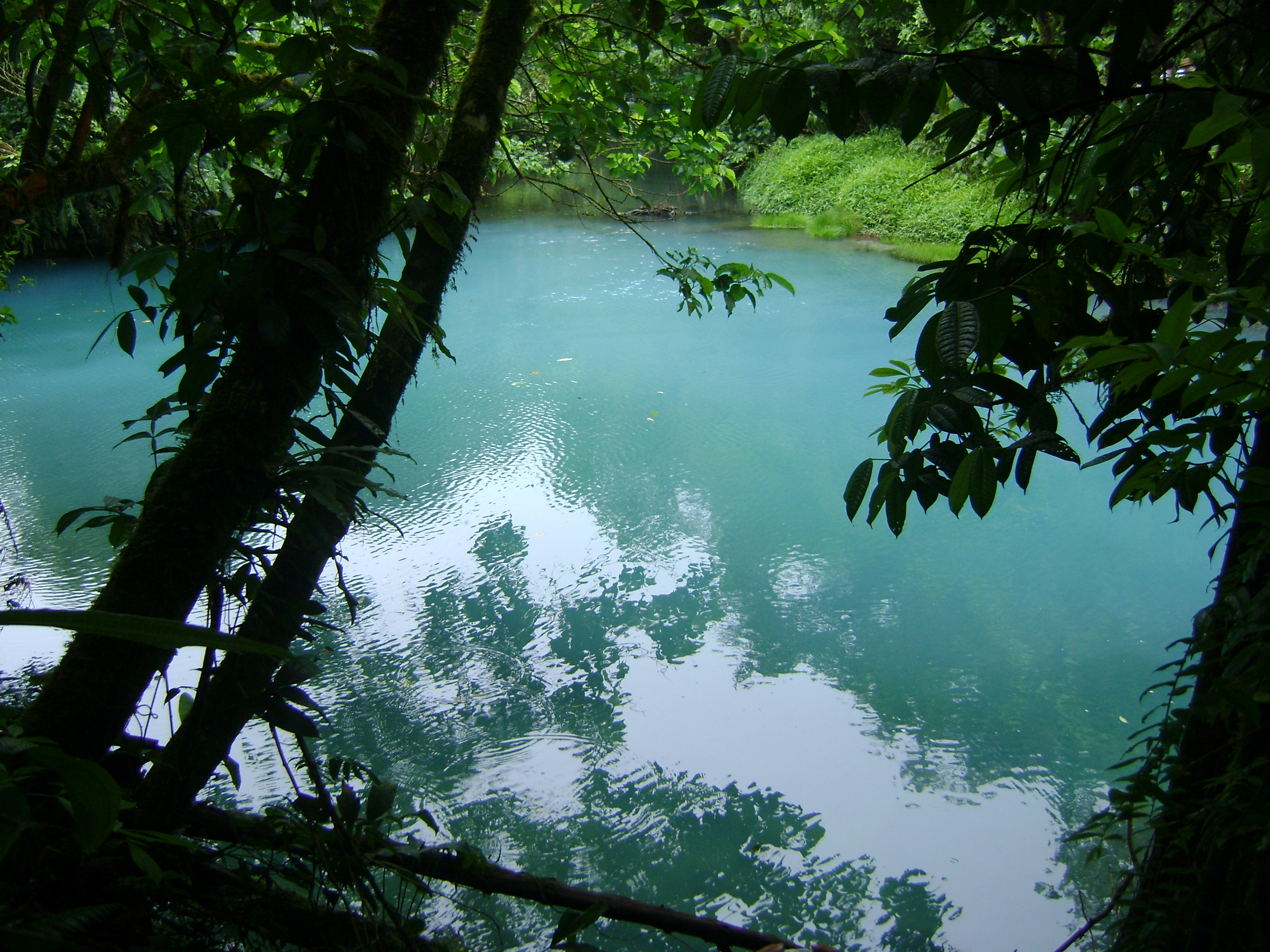
Celeste River, located at Tenorio Volcano National Park, is among the most popular destinations by both foreign and domestic tourists.

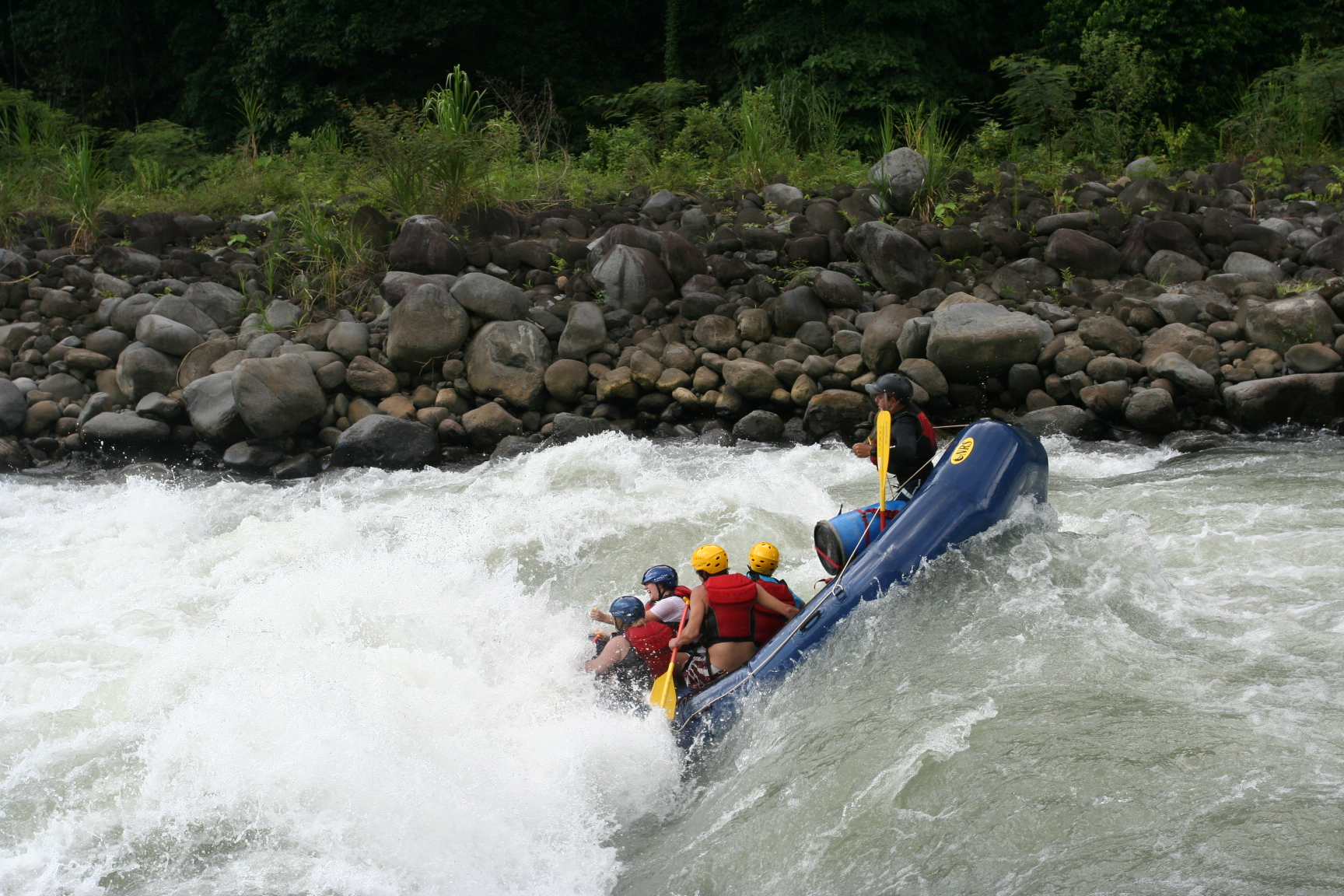
Rafting on the Pacuare River.

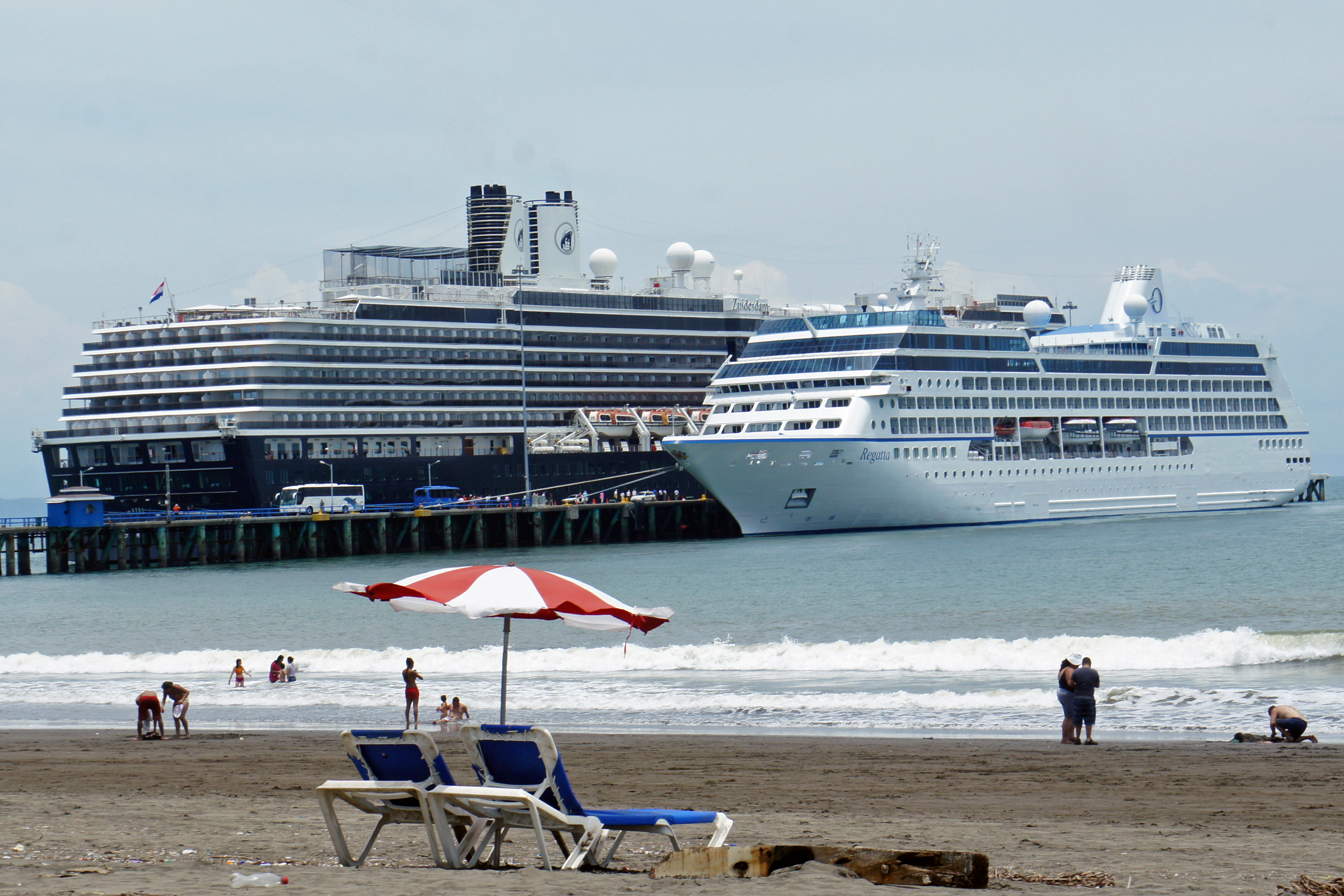
Cruise ships on call at Puntarenas Port in the Pacific.

Ecotourism is extremely popular with the many tourists visiting the extensive national parks and protected areas around the country. Costa Rica was a pioneer in this type of tourism and the country is recognized as one of the few with real ecotourism. In 2006, 54% international tourists visited national parks or protected areas, visiting at least two such natural refuges, and it goes up to three for European visitors.

In recent years, several of Costa Rica's top travel service providers have been internationally recognized for their commitment to planet-positive tourism. Examples include Nature Air and Hotel Punta Islita as winners of the Tourism for Tomorrow Awards, sponsored by the World Travel and Tourism Council (WTTC), and Lapa Rios Ecolodge as winner of the Rainforest Alliance Sustainable Standard-Setter.

=== The "Bandera Azul" Program ===
Implemented in 1996 and inspired by a similar program developed in Europe in 1985, the "Bandera Azul Ecológica" (Ecological Blue Flag) Program is intended to promote development while curbing the negative impacts of mass tourism by helping the local community to work against pollution and protecting the environment. The program evaluates the environmental quality of coastal areas, in terms of the quality of the beaches and sea water, access and quality of drinking water, water and waste management, security, and environmental education. Depending on the degree of compliance against the optimal criteria established, a certain number of stars are awarded to the Blue Flag.

After the first evaluation, ten beaches were awarded the distinction, which usually is highly publicized to potential visitors. In 2008, based on the evaluation carried out in 2007, 59 beaches kept the distinction while eight beaches lost it. In 2009, out of 81 applicants, only 61 beaches won the distinction, and just two obtained the maximum 5 stars, Playa Blanca in Punta Leona and Playa Langosta in Santa Cruz.

=== Voluntary Certification Program ===
Developed in 1997 by the Costa Rican Tourism Board, the public agency responsible for tourism development and regulation in the country, a voluntary Certification for Sustainable Tourism Program (known as CST) was introduced in order to turn "the concept of sustainability into something real" by "improving the way in which the natural and social resources are utilized, to motivate the active participation of the local communities, and to support the competitiveness of the business sector." The program was aimed for all types of businesses in the tourism industry, but it began only with lodging providers. By 2007, a total of 108 parameters are considered for the CST evaluation.

CST hopes to encourage businesses to become sustainable in a variety of ways, including using recycled products, implementing water and energy saving devices, properly disposing and treating waste, conserving and expanding Costa Rica's forests, and developing better systems of information management. As of October 2009, out of approximately 3,000 hotels and tours operators, only 105 have a Certification for Sustainable Tourism. Some tour operators in the U.S. and Europe promote several small hotels that hold this certification through their travel packages.

=== Educational Opportunities ===
Costa Rica is a offers a variety of educational opportunities. In 2005, the country’s oxcarts were recognized by UNESCO as an Intangible Cultural Heritage element. The tradition has changed from a symbol of Spanish colonization to a one associated with Costa Rican cultural identity, as seen in the use of oxcarts on holidays and in other celebrations.

Another educational opportunity is Museo Nacional de Costa Rica. This museum will enlighten you on the lifestyle of ancient cultures through artifacts and carvings recovered over time. Some of the artifacts show a glimpse of the rituals and celebrations that took place in Costa Rica hundreds of years ago. In addition to the artifacts there is information about some of Costa Rica’s political history including involvement in Civil Wars and its well-known presidents.

=== Ethical Traveler Destination ===
Costa Rica was listed by Ethicaltraver.org in "The Developing World's 10 Best Ethical Destinations" for 2011 and 2012. These lists were compiled using metrics such as environmental protection, social welfare, and human rights.

Costa Rica was absent from the list for several years because World Vision considered the country among the world's most notorious destinations for human trafficking and sexual predators. Ethical Traveler included Costa Rica on the 2011 list due to the government's efforts to address the problem.

=== Camino de Costa Rica ===
The Camino de Costa Rica is a 280-kilometre (170 mi) long hiking trail across Costa Rica. It runs from the Atlantic Ocean (Caribbean coast), the southernmost part of the Tortuguero Canals, up the mountain and through indigenous territory near the Barbilla National Park and through valleys and mountain ranges of the central region of the country, just south of the Turrialba and Irazu Volcanos and through the Los Santos coffee region down to the Pacific coast in Quepos. By 2018, the rural population had declined from 40% inhabitants (2000) to 27% inhabitants, poverty at 25% was significantly higher than among the urban population, and income was more than 40% lower. These sobering facts as well as other factors such as level of education, unemployment and underemployment in rural areas gave rise to the NGO, the Asociación Mar a Mar in year 2016. The aim of the Camino de Costa Rica is to establish a world class long-distance trail and through its success in bringing hikers from all over the world, to improve the economic situation in the rural areas of Costa Rica.

== Beaches and adventure ==
Most of the main attractions are nature related, a combination of ecotourism with leisure and adventure activities: sun, sea and sand (55%); flora and wildlife watching (44%); visiting volcanoes (43%); trekking (41%); bird watching (30%); canopy tours (26%); bungee jumping from bridges (11%); surfing (11%); snorkeling (10%); and rafting (7%). Cultural activities such as visiting museums, art galleries and theaters corresponds to 11%, and business travel corresponds to 17%.

Seven Costa Rican resorts were included in the 2012 Condé Nast Traveler Readers' Choice Awards, ranking among the top fifteen resorts in Central and South America. The resorts are Xandari Resort and Spa (2), Four Seasons Resort Costa Rica at Peninsula Papagayo (3), Hotel Punta Islita (8), El Silencio Lodge and Spa (9), Los Sueños Marriott Ocean and Golf Resort (11), Arenas del Mar (12) and the Westin Playa Conchal, Resort and Spa at Playa Conchal (15). The award selection is based on surveys among the magazine's subscribers, who evaluate the resort's quality of rooms, service, food, location, design, and activities. Two hotels were also chosen by the magazine readers among the top five in Central America: Hotel Grano de Oro (3) in San José and Hotel Villa Caletas (4) in Puntarenas Central Pacific.

== Main natural attractions ==
=== National Parks and Biological Reserves ===
In 2009 more than 1.2 million tourists visited national parks and protected wild reserves, up from 812 thousand visitors in 2000 and 510 thousand in 1990. Since 2003 slightly more than half the visitors are international tourists. The most visited parks are Manuel Antonio, Tortuguero, Cahuita, and the parks around the volcanoes Poás, Arenal and Irazú.

Other favorite national parks and wild reserves are:

- Cocos Island, UNESCO World Heritage Site, ranked among the final top 77 nominees in the contest to choose the world's New 7 Wonders of Nature.
- Area de Conservación Guanacaste, UNESCO World Heritage Site,
- La Amistad International Park, UNESCO World Heritage Site, Border Costa Rica-Panama
- Corcovado National Park
- Chirripó National Park
- Tapantí National Park
- Braulio Carrillo National Park
- La Selva Biological Station, Organization for Tropical Studies (private reserve)
- Monteverde Cloud Forest Reserve, Monteverde, Puntarenas (private reserve)

=== Volcanoes ===
- Poás Volcano at Poas Volcano National Park, Alajuela.
- Irazú Volcano at Irazu National Park, Cartago.
- Arenal Volcano at Arenal National Park, Alajuela.
- Turrialba Volcano, at Turrialba Volcano National Park, Cartago.
- Tenorio Volcano National Park, where the popular Rio Celeste (Light Blue River) is located, Guanacaste.
- Rincón de la Vieja at Rincón de la Vieja Volcano National Park, Guanacaste.

=== Beaches ===
See List of beaches of Costa Rica

- Manuel Antonio Beach at Manuel Antonio National Park, was listed by Forbes in 2011 among the world's 12 most beautiful national parks.
- Cahuita Beach at Cahuita National Park, Limón
- Puerto Viejo de Talamanca, Limón
- Manzanillo Beach, Limón
- Gandoca Beach, Limón
- Tamarindo Beach, Guanacaste
- Playa Junquillal, Guanacaste
- Flamingo Beach, Guanacaste
- Conchal Beach, Guanacaste
- Jaco Beach, Puntarenas
- Herradura Beach, Puntarenas
- Montezuma Beach, Puntarenas
- Zancudo Beach, Puntarenas

=== Seven Natural Wonders of Costa Rica ===
Elected in 2007 by Costa Ricans through an open contest organized by a leading newspaper as the "7 natural wonders of Costa Rica", these natural sites are among the most popular destinations by both foreign and domestic tourists, with the exception of Cocos Island, which it is not easily accessed, because it is located in the Pacific Ocean, approximately 550 km (340 mi) from the Pacific shore of Costa Rica.

7 natural wonders of Costa Rica

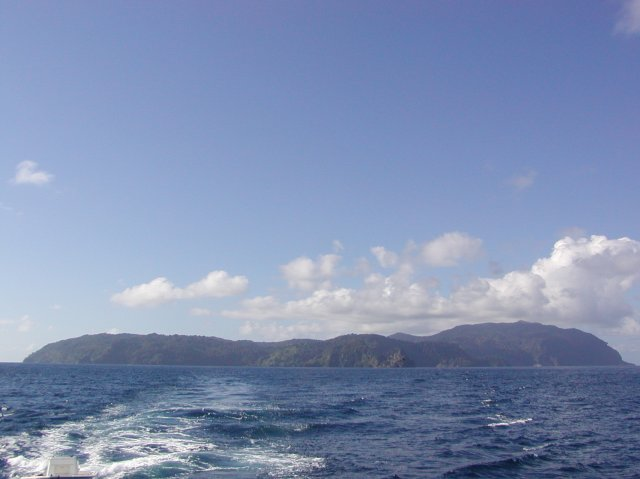
1. Cocos Island (Spanish: Isla del Coco)

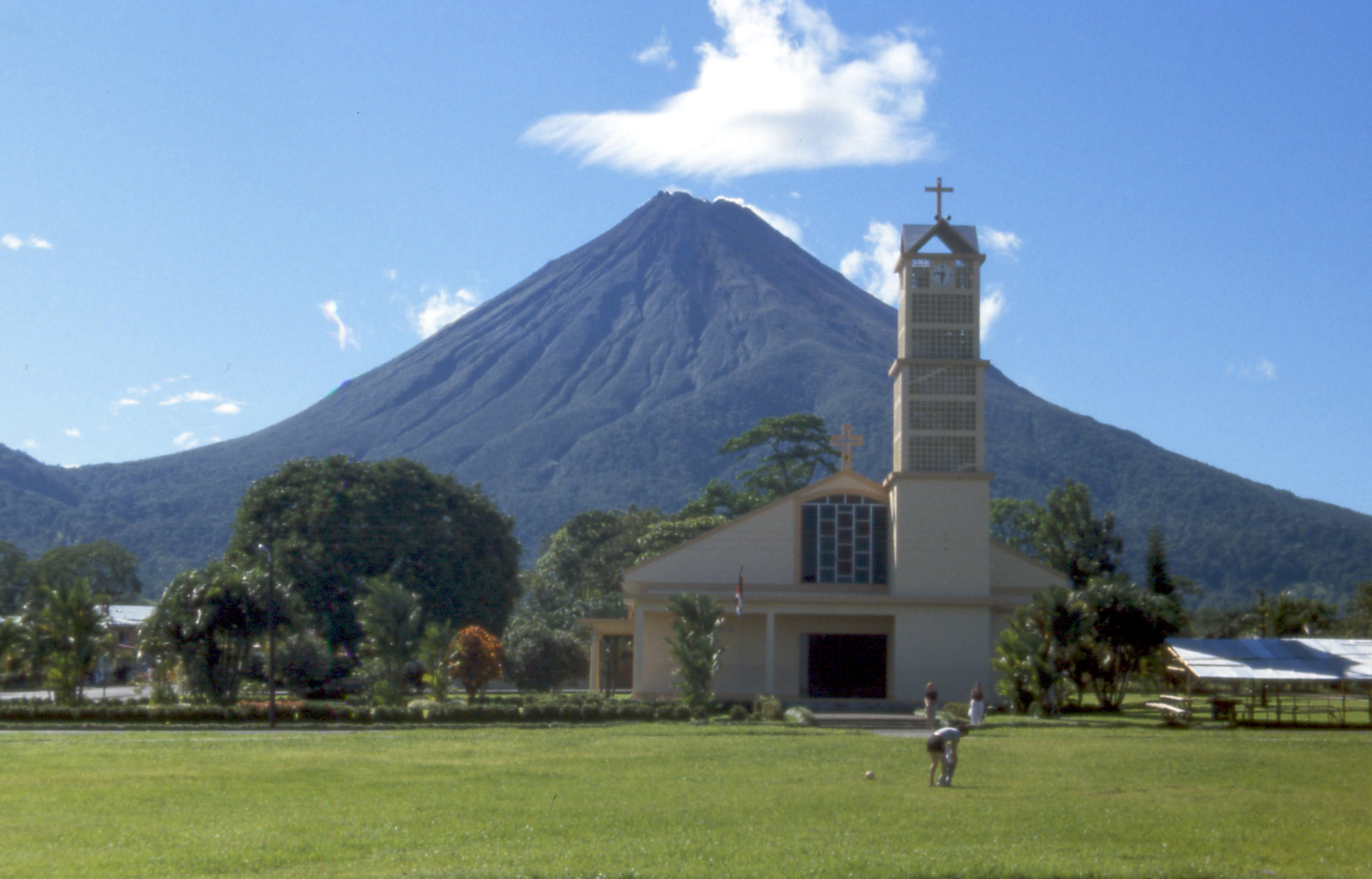
2. Arenal Volcano (Spanish: Volcán Arenal)

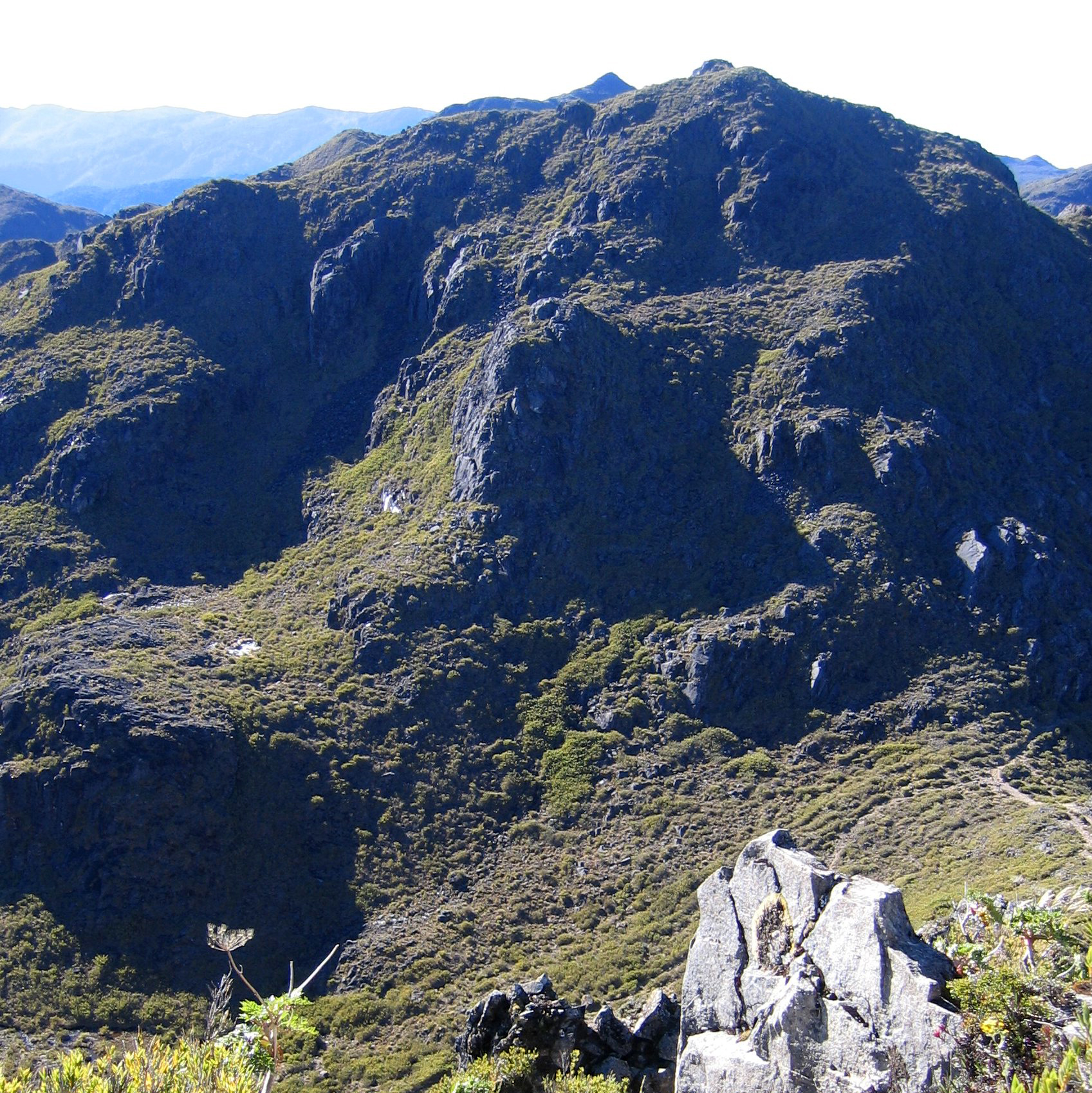
3. Chirripo Mountain (Spanish: Cerro Chirripó)

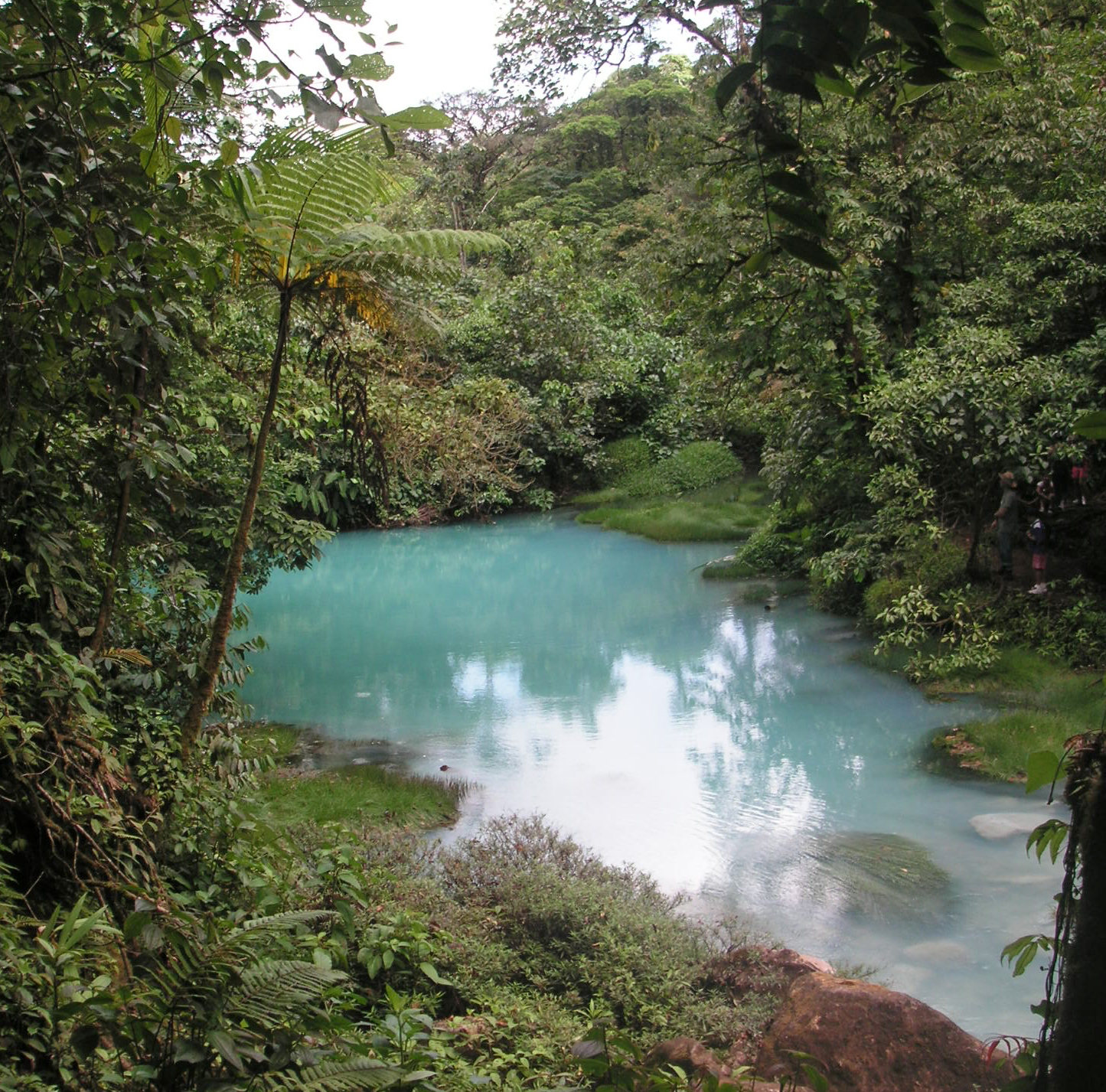
4. Celeste River (Spanish: Río Celeste)

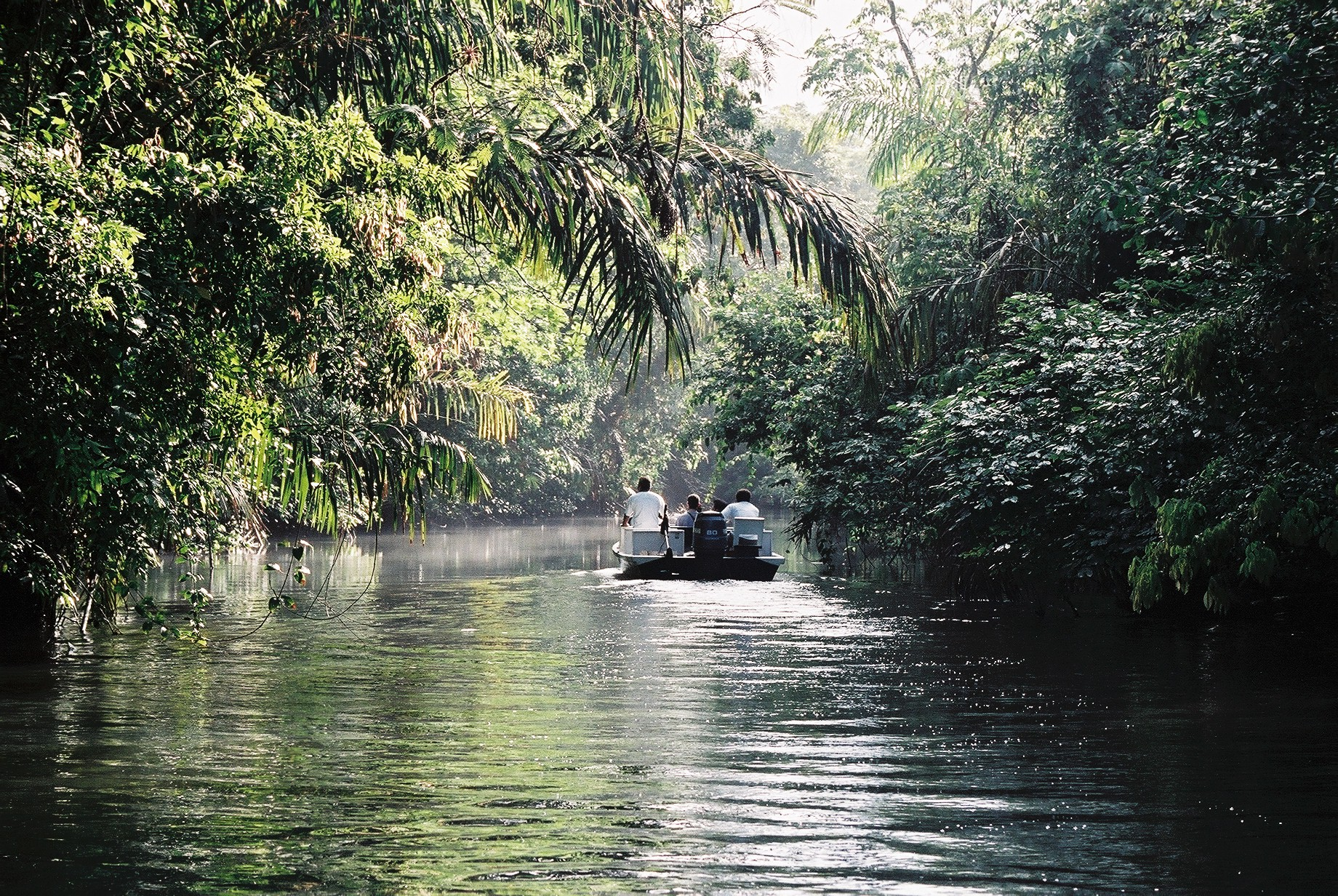
5. Tortuguero Canals (Spanish: Canales de Torguero)

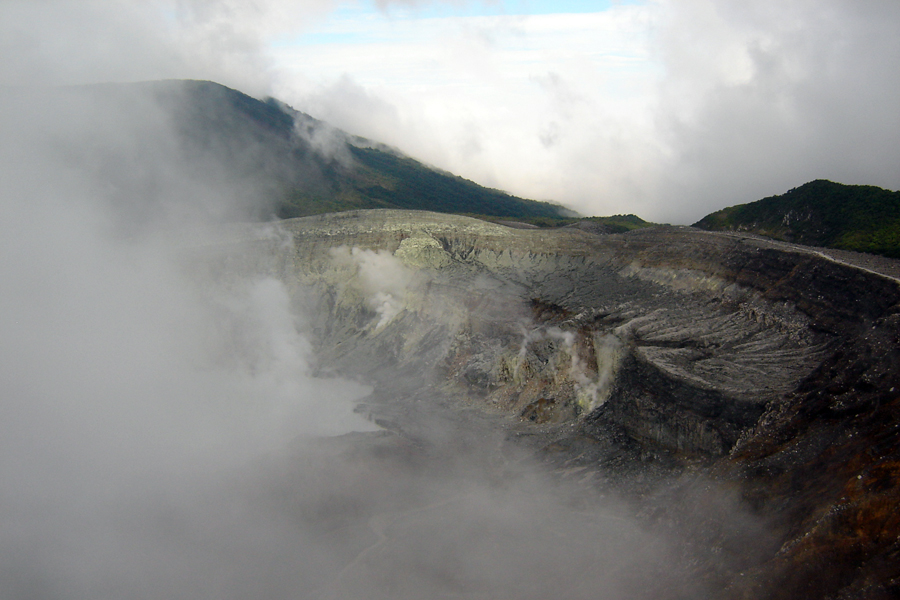
6. Poás Volcano (Spanish: Volcán Poás)

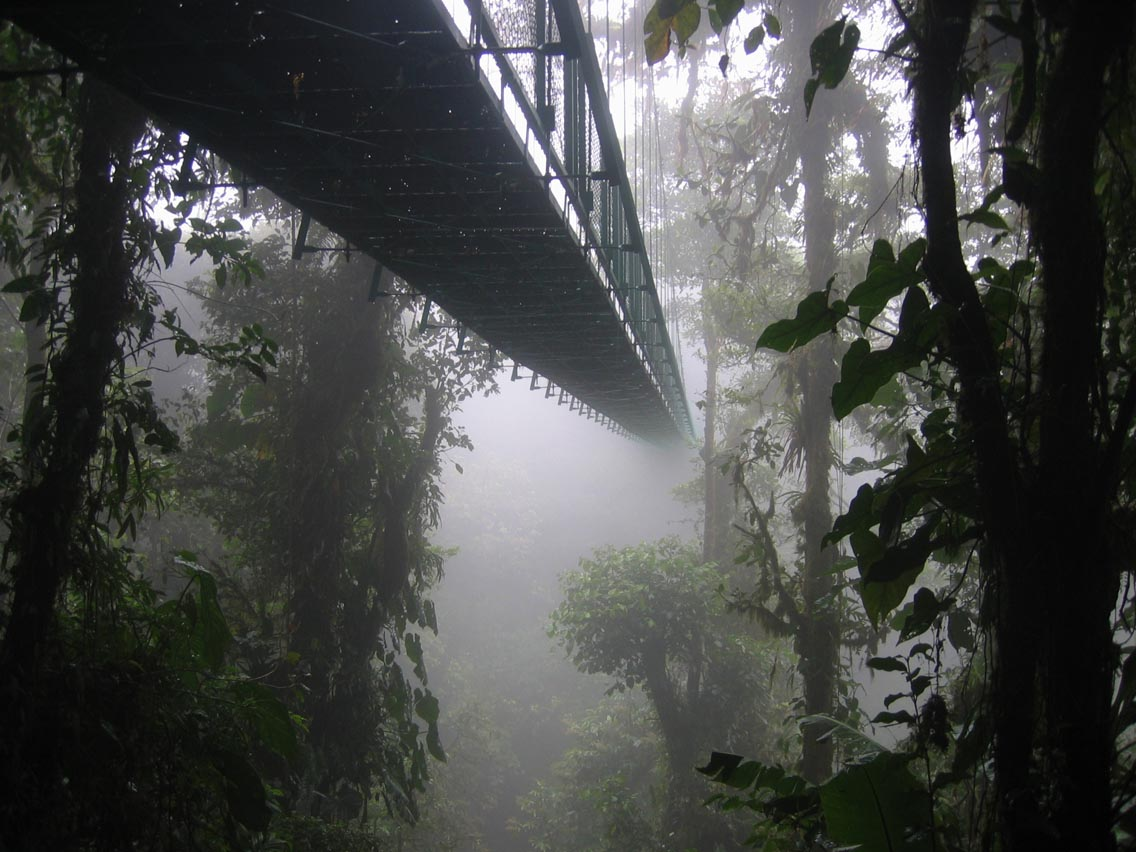
7. Monteverde Reserve (Spanish: Reserva Monteverde)

== Other activities and popular destinations ==
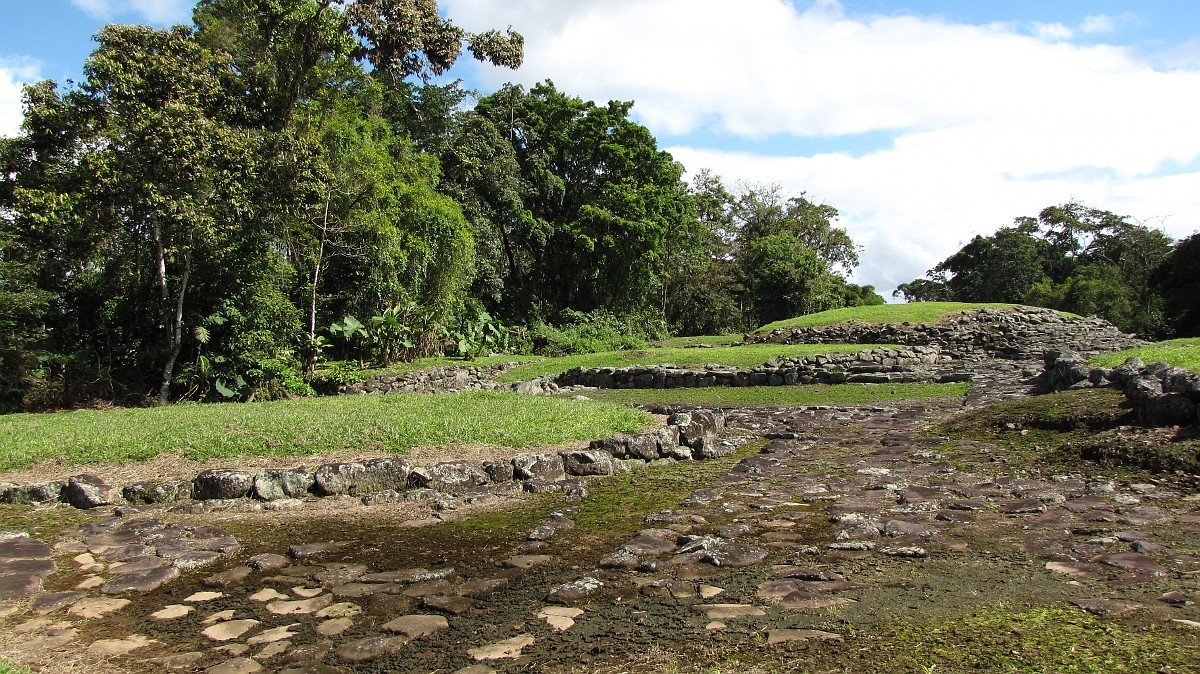
The Guayabo archaeological site, Turrialba.

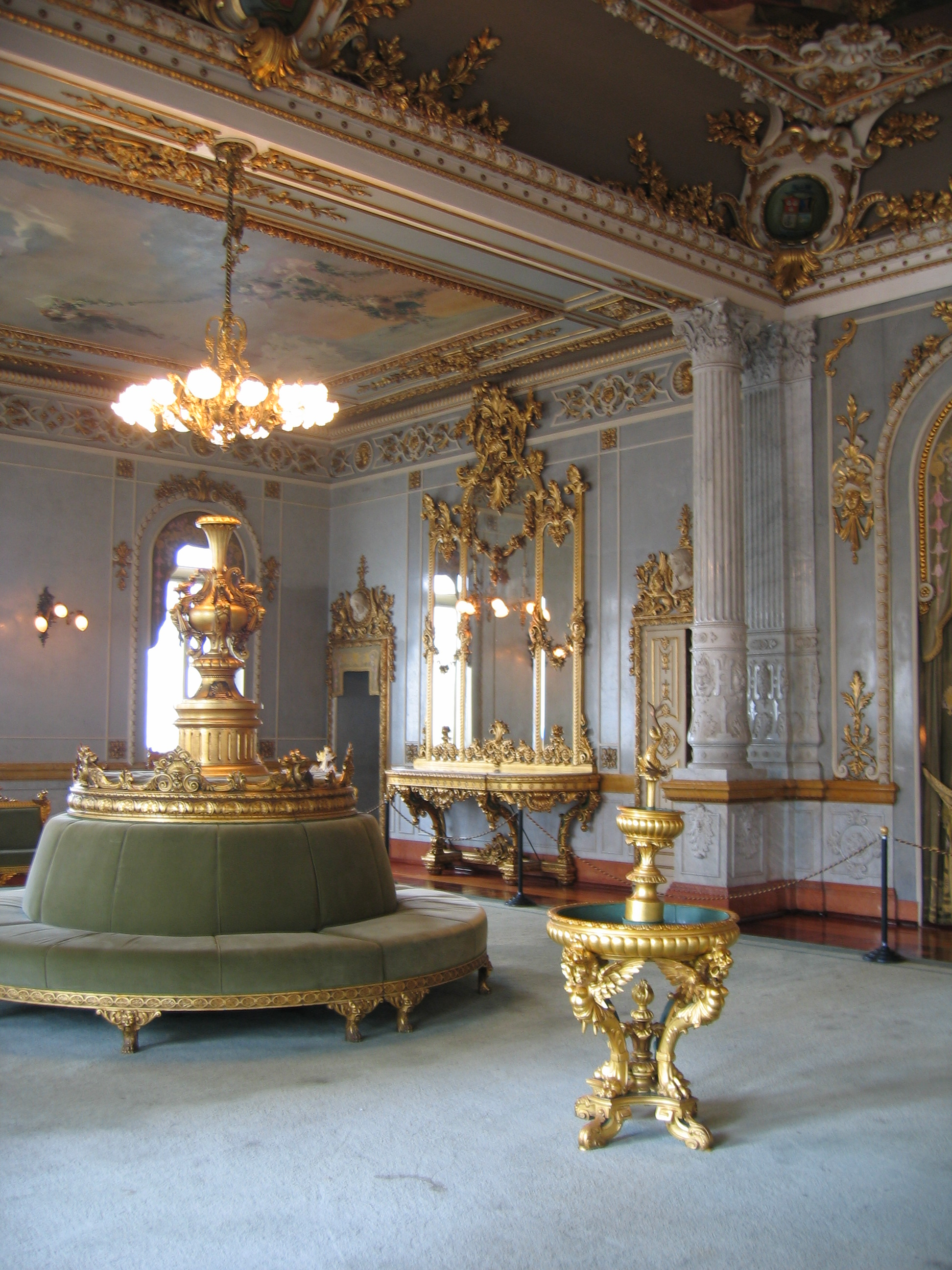
Interior of Teatro Nacional de Costa Rica (El Foyer).

- Sarchí, Alajuela, for shopping souvenirs and typical products, including the popular Costa Rican ox carts.
- INBioparque, Instituto Nacional de Biodiversidad, Santo Domingo de Heredia.
- Lankester Botanical Garden, Cartago.
- Orosí Colonial Church and Ujarrás historical site, Cartago.
- Basílica de Nuestra Señora de los Angeles, (Basilica of Our Lady of the Angels), Cartago.
- Guayabo arqueologichal site, Turrialba, Cartago.
- Teatro Nacional de Costa Rica (National Theater), San José.
- Teatro Popular Melico Salazar (Popular Theater), San José.
- Centro Nacional de Arte y Cultura (National Center of Arts and Culture), San José.
- Museo Nacional de Costa Rica (National Museum), San José.
- Museo de Oro de Costa Rica Precolombino (Pre-Columbian Gold Museum), Central Bank of Costa Rica, San José.
- Museo de Jade, (Jade Museum), Instituto Nacional de Seguros en San José.
- Museo Filatélico de Costa Rica (Philately Museum)
- Museo Juan Santamaría en Alajuela
- Museo de los Niños, (Children Museum), San José.
- Parque Zoológico Nacional Simón Bolívar, (National Zoo), San José.
- Camino de Costa Rica (hiking trail across the country, from the Atlantic to the Pacific coast)

== Medical Tourism ==
Costa Rica, together with Cuba, Mexico, Panama, Colombia, Brazil, and Chile, is among the Latin America countries that have become popular destinations for medical tourism. In 2009 Costa Rica received 30,000 international tourists seeking for medical treatment, and spent around US$250 million. Most medical travelers came from the United States and Canada. During 2010, the number of patients rose to 36,000 international tourists, with 40% of them receiving dental care services. In 2011, that number continued to rise, eventually reaching 46,474.

Costa Rica is particularly attractive to American tourists because of its proximity and short flight, the quality of medical services and its health care system, and lower medical costs. The country has 20 medical centers, including small clinics and private hospitals, with international certification, including two hospitals accredited by the Joint Commission International.

American tourists prefer Costa Rica, together with Mexico and Panama, for dental services or cosmetic surgeries. Costa Rica offers 30% to 50% savings as compared to U.S. costs for quality dental and cosmetic surgery services, and is attractive for those U.S. citizens without health insurance or seeking procedures not covered by their health insurance plans. Foreign patients also find lower-priced nonsurgical procedures and tests, as an example, a magnetic resonance imaging (MRI) in Costa Rica costs from $200 to $300, compared to more than $1,000 in the United States. In average medical costs are 70% lower than in the U.S. Due to the country's natural attractions, many health tourists combine their treatment with ecotourism and offer an opportunity to their family or companions to be entertained while the patient undergoes the medical procedure.

== Environmental and social impacts ==
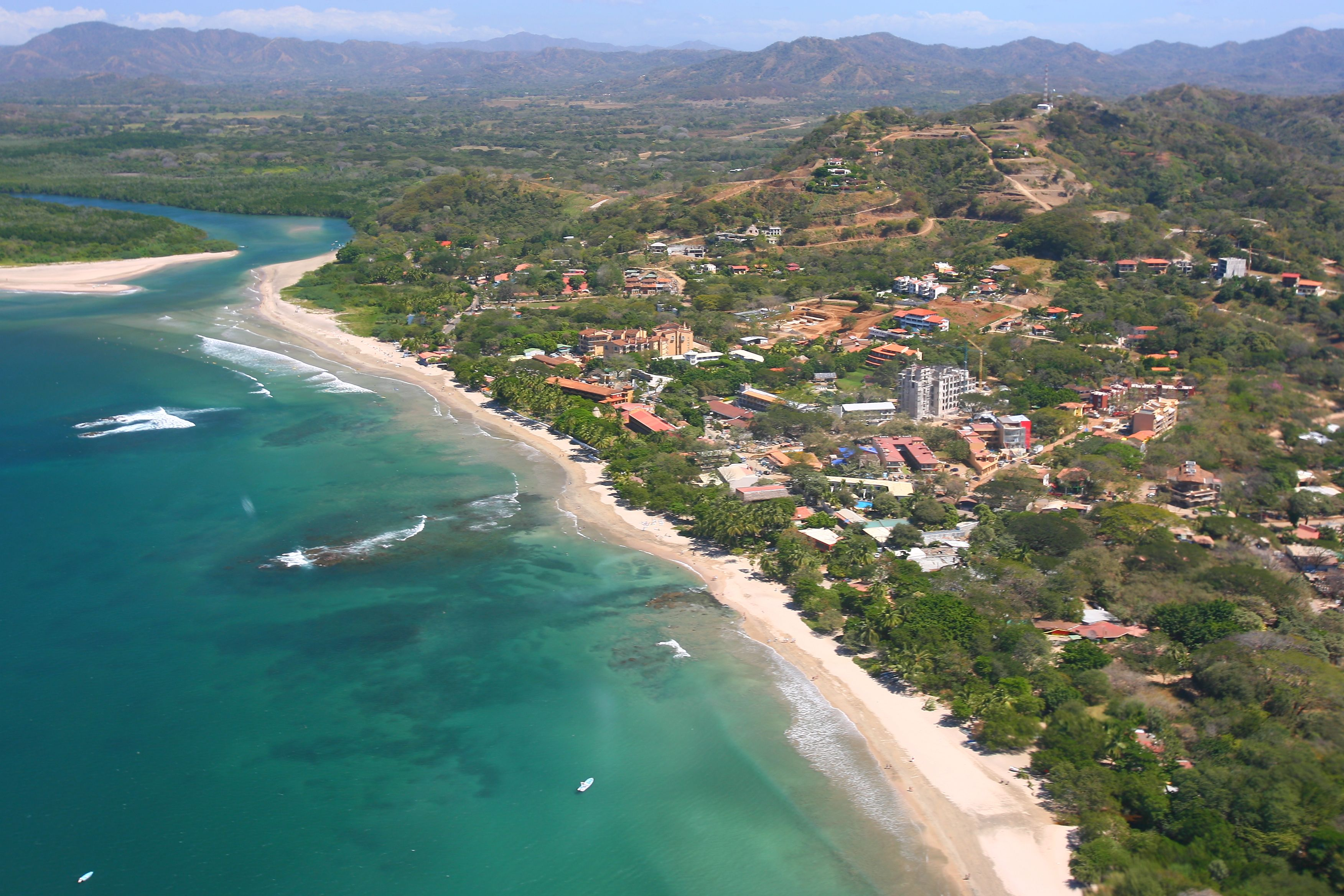
Beachfront development boom in Tamarindo beach (circa 2007).

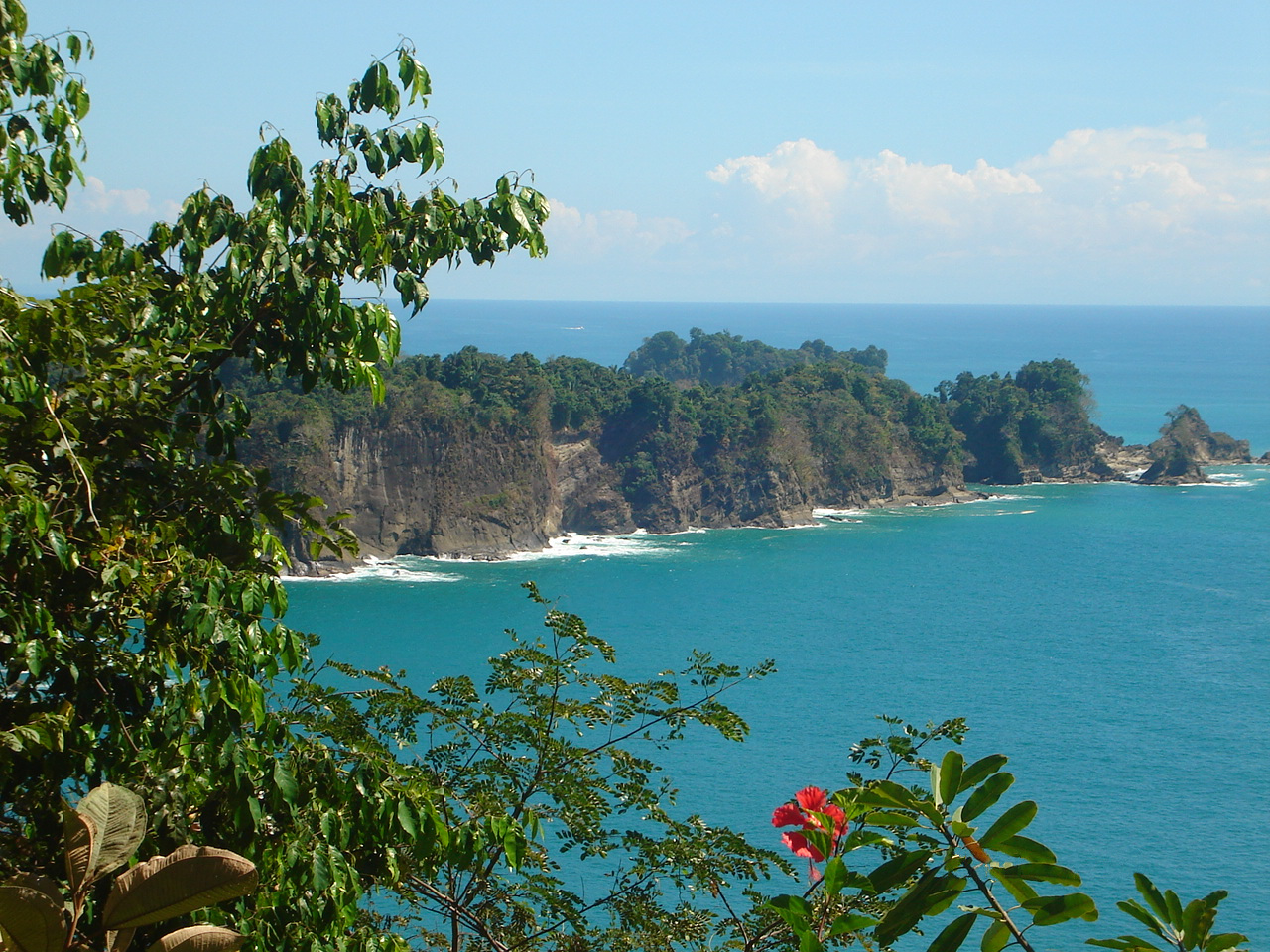
Manuel Antonio beach

=== Beachfront developments ===
In many beach areas, but especially in the towns of Tamarindo and Jacó, a real estate boom took place when many foreigners from developed countries began buying beachfront properties and building holiday and vacation houses and condominiums. These developments completely changed the life style in these towns, and property prices are now so high that it became prohibitive for Costa Ricans to own beach front properties. Also, the lack of planning for these developments is having a negative social impact on small communities, as in some cases they are forced to move to places with less adequate infrastructure and where not enough job opportunities exist.

=== Hotel siting and construction ===
Also there have been isolated controversies regarding the site location and construction of hotels and beach resorts invading the 50 metres (160 ft) protected maritime public zone; also a case of one hotel located within a protected area; and a few cases of resort development with severe negative impacts to existing flora and fauna, by dumping construction wastes damaging coral reefs or filling mangroves. As a result of these and other similar controversies, the Environment Law 7554 was passed in 1995 to require environmental impact studies before a hotel or any other development is authorized to begin construction.

Another source of pollution is due to dumping untreated sewage into rivers that feed into the beach towns. In 2007 the Constitutional Court order the national and 34 local governments to stop dumping sewage into the Río Grande de Tárcoles, to restore the watershed to its unpolluted condition and to adopt an integrated solution to the wastewater problem. Towns such as Jacó where tourism and real estate development has grown ten-fold since 2004 suffered from backlash in September 2008 when the government blamed the local government of Garabito for high levels of bacteria on the beach.

More recently, controversy took place with the construction of the Sardinal-El Coco-Ocotal aqueduct by private developers, as the community of Sardinal protested violently because they fear that scarce drinking water will be diverted for the tourism developments whose owners are financing the pipeline. As of May 2008, construction works were stopped by order of the local municipality. Developers and the government authorities have explained the aqueduct is public, and that it will benefit not only the tourism developments but also the surrounding communities. Controversy still persists regarding the real capacity of the Sardinal aquifer.

=== Sex tourism ===
The rapid growth of tourism also has the consequence of the country becoming a popular destination for sex tourism. Despite the government and industry efforts, child sex trade has become a problem. A study estimated that "up to 10% of tourists who come to Costa Rica engage in sex tourism", with as many as 10,000 sex workers involved, many of whom are immigrants. Also it was reported that about 80% of the sex tourists are from the US. This is largely because prostitution is not illegal but many of the activities surrounding it are indeed illegal, such as pimping.

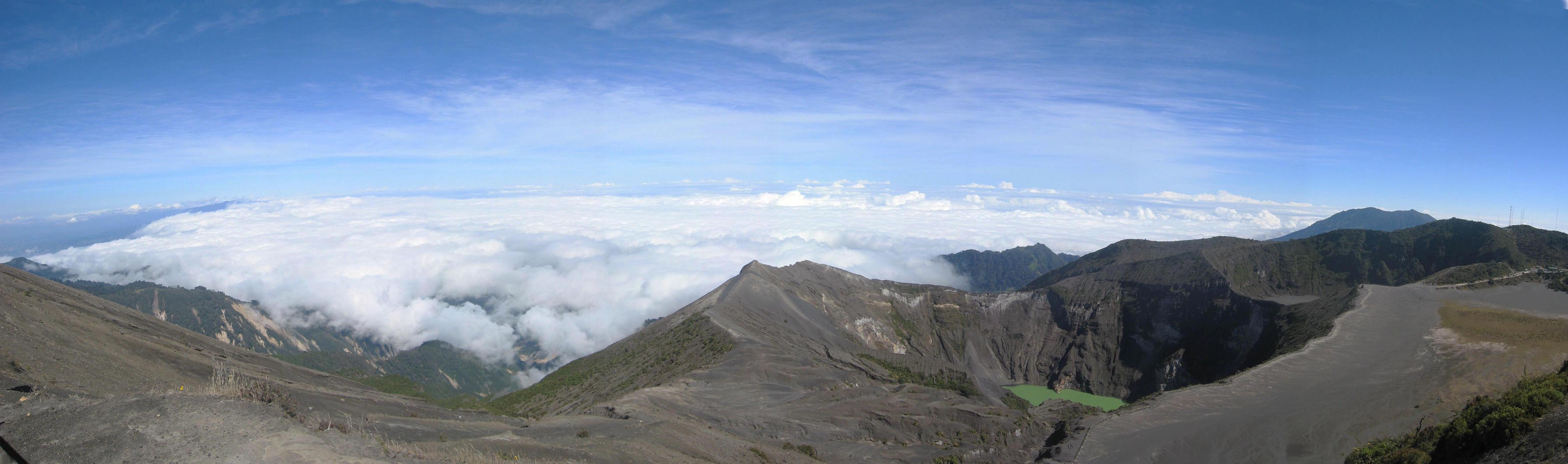
A panoramic view from the summit of the Irazú Volcano.

== See also ==
- Ecotourism in Costa Rica
- Guayabo archeological site
- Islands of Costa Rica
- List of airports in Costa Rica
- List of museums in Costa Rica
- National Parks of Costa Rica
- Visa policy of Costa Rica
