= Tapir Valley tree frog =

Scientific classification
- Kingdom: Animalia
- Phylum: Chordata
- Class: Amphibia
- Order: Anura
- Family: Hylidae
- Genus: Tlalocohyla
- Species: T. celeste

Binomial name
- Tlalocohyla celeste Varela-Soto et al., 2022

Species of amphibian

The Tapir Valley tree frog (Tlalocohyla celeste) is a species of frog in the family Hylidae only found in the area of the Costa Rican Tapir Valley Nature Reserve.

== Etymology ==
The scientific name Tlalocohyla celeste for the species was chosen because of the light blue coloration observed in the axillary membranes and male vocal sac. The name was given as a tribute to the turquoise waters of a nearby river, the Río Celeste.

== Description ==
The size of the species is very small, only around 2 centimeters (0.8 inches) long. The frog is easily distinguishable from all other Tlalocohyla species due to its striking green coloration, featuring a prominent, incomplete light dorsolateral stripe bordered above by a faint reddish-brown stripe. Its back is adorned with distinct reddish-brown spots, and its ventral skin is completely transparent. There is light blue coloration in the armpits and on the male vocal sac.

The frog has slender upper arms and forearms, lacking an ulnar skin fold. Its palm has numerous rounded accessory palmar tubercles, and the inner metacarpal tubercle is large and elliptical. The finger discs are round, with the first finger's disc slightly smaller. The frog has smooth nuptial pads on the first finger's base. The webbing between the first and second fingers is minimal.

The hind limbs are slender, with a medium-sized elliptical inner metatarsal tubercle and no outer metatarsal tubercle. The skin is smooth, but granular on certain parts. The female's snout-vent length is longer than the male's. The frog's snout appears almost rounded from the back and rounded and protruding from the side. It has large, bulging eyes with horizontally elliptical pupils.

== Distribution and habitat ==
The sole known habitat of this species is only the type locality, an 8-hectare (20-acre) lentic wetland with an emergent benthic zone dominated by herbaceous vegetation, all of which is surrounded by a tropical rainforest located between two volcanoes in the Tapir Valley Nature Reserve, which is adjacent to the Tenorio Volcano National Park in northern Costa Rica. Its habitat is in the marsh's shallow region, which primarily has the grass species Rhynchospora corymbosa. However, near the water in the riparian zone, the vegetation becomes more varied and includes shrubs and trees that eventually link to the forest found at higher elevations.

== Behaviour ==
It hides well among the vegetation, camouflaging itself on tall grasses. The species has a unique sound that they make with their vocal sacs, but they use it especially during high rains. The frog is primarily nocturnal, as it is usually active at night, but it can also be found in the early morning hours when breeding.

== Reproduction ==
This species practices axillary amplexus during reproduction, and fertilized females have been observed between June and September. Amplectant pairs are seen during the night and pre-dawn hours, separating shortly after egg-laying. Females can undergo multiple oviposition events during each breeding cycle. Egg masses are discovered on the tips of drooping leaves above the water from June to November.

This indicates that the eggs hatch into exotrophic tadpoles, which then fall into the still fresh water below. Each egg mass contains around 20 to 61 unpigmented eggs, longer in length than width, and approximately 2.0 mm in diameter. Tadpoles emerge ten days after oviposition, and after five days, they display clear developmental signs, turning light brown with black spots. Observations show individuals catching micromoths and small flies, suggesting their diet primarily consists of small vertebrates.

== Discovery ==
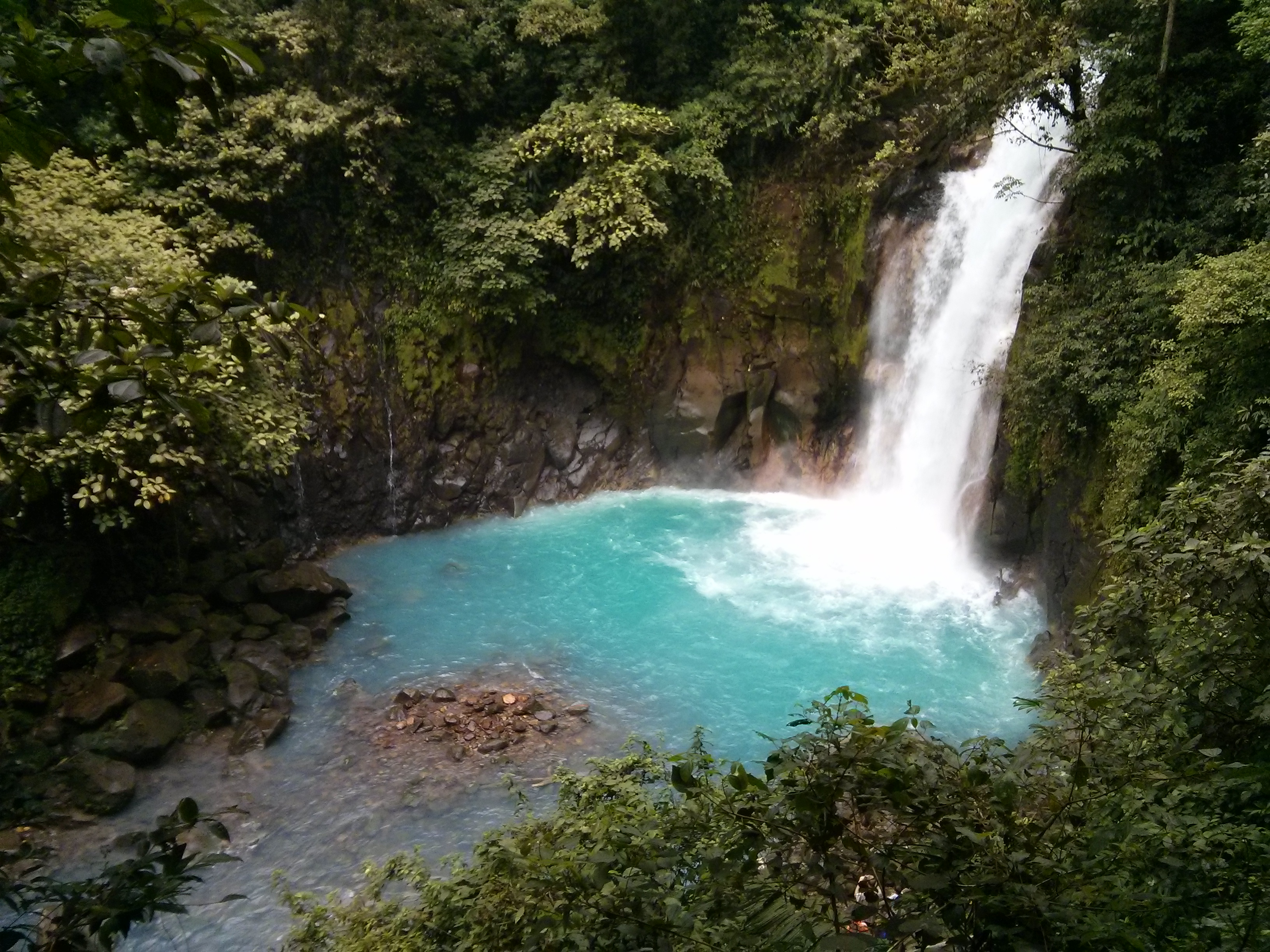
The scientific name was given as a tribute to the water of the Celeste river

Donald Varela Soto, naturalist and co-owner of the Tapir Valley Nature Reserve, was the first to discover the species after noticing its peculiar sound. Around 2018, he already noticed the frog's shrill calls, as none of the other 16 frogs living there have a similar voice. He studied the wetland's sounds at night with biologist Valeria Espinall's help. Researchers actively searched for tadpoles to differentiate the species from others and understand its habitat requirements.

Despite comparisons to regional field guides and iNaturalist, the frog did not match any known species. Speculations arose about it being a young Boana rufitela, but Soto remained uncertain due to the absence of the characteristic yellow line. Soto recorded a video of the frog and contacted other herpetologists. After a thorough analysis, it was confirmed that the frog was indeed a new species, and named Tlalocohyla celeste by the research team.

== Conservation ==
The conservation status of the Tapir Valley tree frog is currently unknown, but scientists think it is probably a critically endangered species and may be on the verge of extinction. The species resides in the Tapir Valley Nature Reserve, which was previously heavily grazed pasture land. Thanks to recent conservation efforts, the area has been restored to a wetland habitat, where the species now thrives. This indicates that the species, along with others in the wetland, including the Tapir Valley tree frog, possess significant adaptability and resistance to environmental changes.

While no direct predation observations have been made, the wetland harbors snakes and ctenid spiders, known frog predators. Opilionid arachnids have been seen scavenging a dead frog, and wasps have been observed attacking frog eggs and developing larvae.
