= Flamingo, Costa Rica =

Beach in Costa Rica

Playa Flamingo (Flamingo Beach) is one of Costa Rica's most popular beaches with fine white sand. It has pristine clear blue waters, lagoons, vegetation and abundance of activities. The Playa Flamingo area offers a wide variety of secluded beaches and lagoons due to the mountain formations reaching into the sea. It features hotels, lodging, luxury homes, entertainment, water, land and leisure activities.

Playa Flamingo is located in fairly close proximity to the Daniel Oduber Quirós International Airport. Playa Flamingo has two quite distinct seasons. The dry season runs from mid-November until early May. The wet or "green" season runs from mid-May to mid-November. During the dry season you can expect to see sunshine every day with next to no precipitation. During the wet season, most of the day tends to remain sunny with very strong rain happening most evenings and sometimes early mornings as well.

The area is possibly best known for its scuba diving. There are several dive shops in town which provide service to the Catalina Islands. These are a series of islands which protrude from the Pacific and are home to a huge amount of marine life including the majestic giant pacific manta. Many scuba diving shops also offer diving to nearby destinations such as the Bat Islands as well as diving in the Gulf de Papagayo.

== See also ==
- Tourism in Costa Rica
- Country Day School, local school
