= Costa Rica International Academy =

Coordinates: 10.39441°N 85.78890°W

Costa Rica International Academy, Guanacaste
- Brasilito, Guanacaste 81125; Costa Rica

Information
- School type: Private international school
- Motto: Think. Aspire. Achieve
- Principal: Lois Mare
- Grades: Pre-kindergarten–12
- Colors: Red and black
- Mascot: Pirates
- Information: 1-928-208-4501
- Website: criacademy.com

Costa Rica International Academy (CRIA) is a private, United States-accredited, day school located between the Flamingo Beach and Tamarindo Beach in Brasilito, Guanacaste, Costa Rica. CRIA is 1 of 10 US accredited schools in Costa Rica, and the only one in Guanacaste province. It was originally founded as Country Day School (CDS). The school serves students in grades pre-K to twelfth grade. The school is owned and operated by the board of directors, making it privately owned. In 2014 the school was renamed to Costa Rica International Academy. The school has uniforms that include navy blue shorts.
