= Costa Rican Tourism Board =

Government agency in Costa Rica

- Instituto Costarricense de Turismo

Agency overview
- Formed: August 9, 1955; 70 years ago
- Preceding agency: National Tourism Board (1931)
- Headquarters: San José, Costa Rica
- Minister responsible: William Rodríguez López, Minister of Tourism
- Website: www.ict.go.cr/en/

The Costa Rican Tourism Board (Spanish: Instituto Costarricense de Turismo) is a government agency responsible for promoting sustainable tourism in Costa Rica.

== History ==
Given the country's rich natural surroundings, Costa Rica has prioritized its tourism industry since the early 1900s. In 1931, the Costa Rican government, in its bid to regulate the development of the industry, created the National Tourism Board (Spanish: Junta Nacional de Turismo). Around two decades later, the government decided the agency needed an upgrade, along with better financing and decentralization. By decree of August 9, 1955, the resulting agency was renamed the Costa Rican Tourism Board.

On December 2, 1960, the Legislative Assembly passed a law declaring tourism to be a public interest, levying a new 3% tax on hotel and pension stays, with the funds earmarked for the Costa Rican Tourism Board.

In the mid 1980s, Costa Rica reoriented its economy toward a neoliberal model, with a focus on exports and service industries, especially tourism. In 1985, the Tourism Board began a policy of fiscal incentives for tourism development. These incentives include tax exemptions for companies providing hotel services, air transport, car rental, restaurant services, travel agencies, and other tourism related services.

In 1997, the agency introduced the voluntary Certification for Sustainable Tourism Program in order to turn "the concept of sustainability into something real" by "improving the way in which natural and social resources are utilized, to encourage the active participation of local communities, and to support competition in the business sector. The program was originally envisioned for a broad cross-section of the tourism industry, but it began with hospitality businesses only.

== Function ==
According to the agency's organic law, it's functions include building and administering hospitality establishments when the private sector fails to do so in a satisfactory manner; advertising abroad in order to attact visitors; promoting commercial, athletic, artistic and cultural events, with an emphasis on folkloric activities; protecting and promoting historical, scientific, and natural sites, with an emphasis on preserving native flora and fauna; and maintaining national parks.

== See also ==
- Economy of Costa Rica
- Tourism in Costa Rica
