= Celeste River =

River in Costa Rica notable for its turquoise color

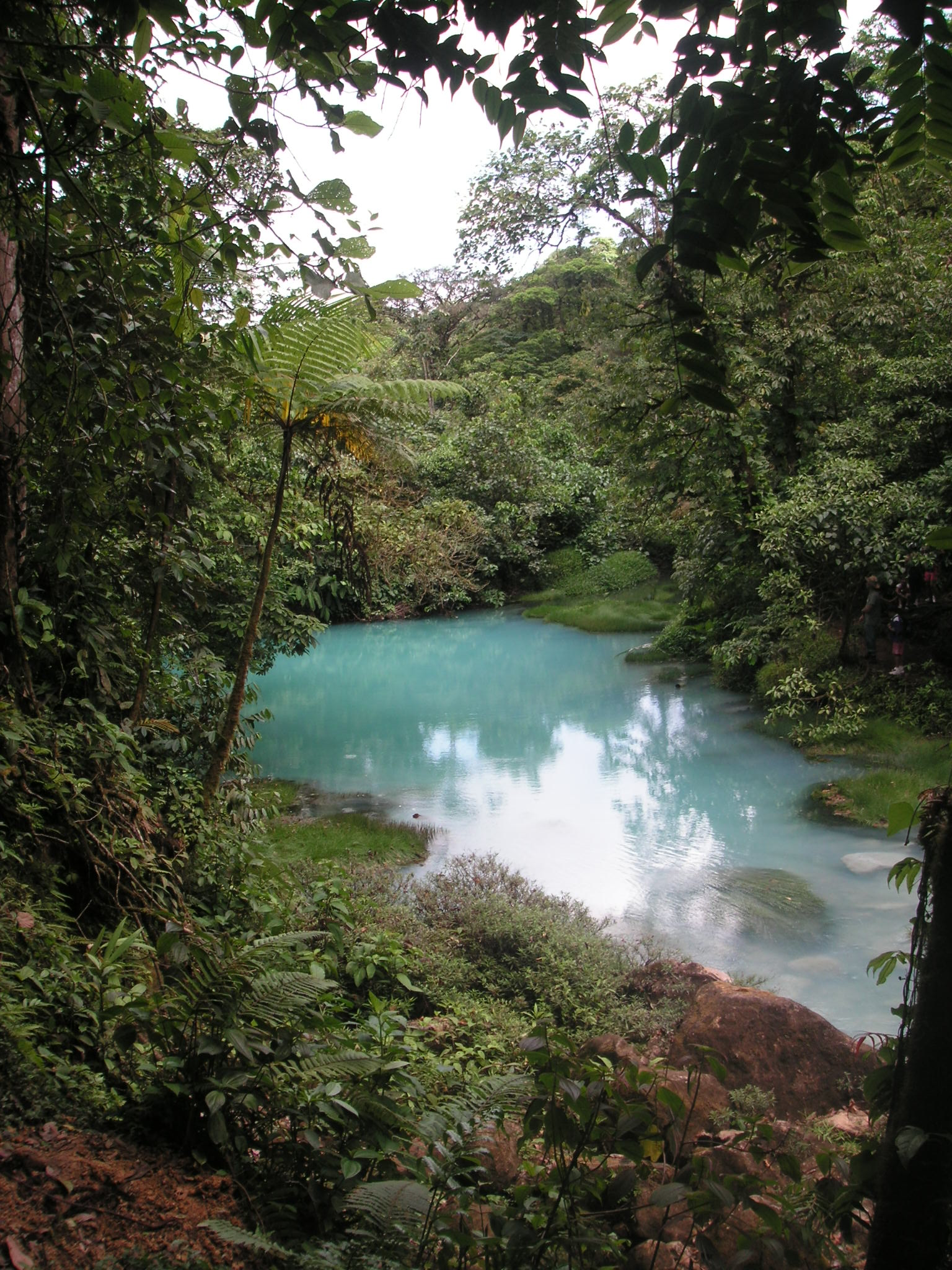
Rio Celeste (sky blue river) at Tenorio Volcano National Park

Celeste River (Spanish pronunciation: [seˈleste]) is a river in Tenorio Volcano National Park of Costa Rica. It is notable for its distinctive turquoise coloration. The Celeste River also borders several hot springs and has one large waterfall. It takes about an hour to hike to the waterfall from the park's entrance.

== Origin of color ==
The source of the river's distinctive turquoise color is not due to a chemical species but to a physical phenomenon known as Mie scattering. Celeste River is fed by two colorless rivers, the Buenavista River and Sour Creek. Buenavista River carries a large concentration of aluminosilicate particles with a small diameter. Sour Creek, as its name implies, has a high acidity due to volcanic activity. When these two streams mix to form Celeste River, the drop in pH causes the aluminosilicate particles to aggregate and enlarge to a diameter of about 566 nm. These suspended particles produce Mie scattering which gives the river a strong turquoise color.

== See also ==
- Tourism in Costa Rica
