= Tenorio Volcano National Park =

National Park in Costa Rica

- IUCN category II (national park)
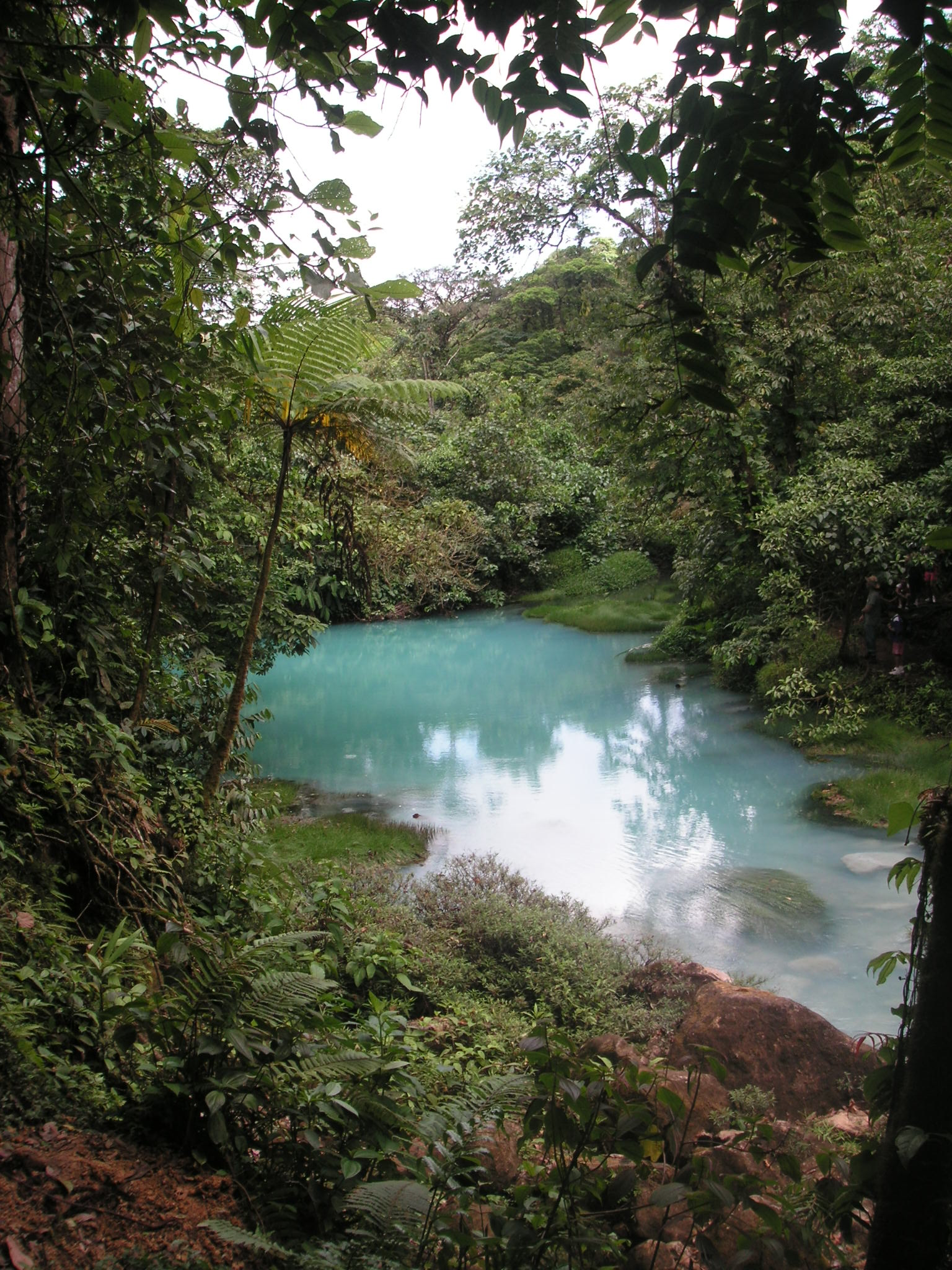
- Celeste River within the park.
- Tenorio Volcano National Park
- Location: Costa Rica
- Coordinates: 10°40′23″N 85°0′54″W
- Area: 129 km^{2} (50 sq mi)
- Established: 1976
- Governing body: National System of Conservation Areas (SINAC)
- Location in Costa Rica

Tenorio Volcano National Park (Spanish: Parque Nacional Volcán Tenorio) is a national park in the northern part of Costa Rica, which forms part of the Arenal Tempisque Conservation Area. The jewel of the national park is the Tenorio Volcano, from which it derives its name. The volcano was made part of the National Park in 1995 and is located about 26 miles (42 km) northeast of Fortuna in the Guanacaste Province.

The blue color of the Rio Celeste results from Mie scattering of light by colloidal aluminosilicate particles suspended in the water; the coloration appears after the volcanic Río Buenavista stream mixes with the acidic Quebrada Agria, causing the particles to aggregate. Thermal springs and small geysers dot the area as do rivers, waterfalls, lagoons, and places providing panoramic views. The upper area of the park is dominated by primary cloud forest, while the lower regions are carpeted with rain forest. The tapir and the rarely seen puma reside in the area.

A ranger station at the base of the volcano provides visitors with basic information. The volcano's summit can be reached via the Lago Las Dantas Trail, which winds up the volcano and passes through forested terrain before eventually reaching the peak.

Tenorio Volcano National Park adjoins Tapir Valley Nature Reserve, a former cattle ranch that was rewilded in 2004. The 20-acre (8-hectare) wetland within the nature reserve is the only known location of the Tapir Valley tree frog (Tlalocohyla celeste).
