= World Travel and Tourism Council =

Forum for the travel and tourism industry

World Travel & Tourism Council (WTTC)
- Type: Non-profit, non-governmental
- Industry: Travel and tourism
- Founded: 1990
- Headquarters: Madrid, Spain
- Key people: Manfredi Lefebvre - Chairman; Gloria Guevara - President and CEO
- Website: wttc.org researchhub.wttc.org

The World Travel & Tourism Council (WTTC) is a forum for the travel and tourism industry. It is made up of members from the global business community and works with governments to raise awareness about the travel and tourism industry. It is known for being the only forum to represent the private sector in all parts of the industry worldwide. Its activities include research on the economic and social impact of the industry and its organization of global and regional summits focused on issues and developments relevant to the industry.

== History ==
The WTTC began in the 1980s with a group of business executives led by former American Express CEO James D. Robinson III. The group was formed to discuss the travel and tourism industry and the need for more data relating to the importance of what some believed was a non-essential industry. Discussions led to the first meeting of the WTTC in Paris in 1989. The first meeting included a speech by former United States Secretary of State Henry Kissinger who suggested that the travel and tourism industry was not widely recognized due to its not having any organisation or structure. The WTTC was officially established in 1990.

The first annual general meeting took place in Washington, D.C., in 1991, at which time the council was composed of 32 members. These initial members agreed on the need for a common effort to promote awareness of the economic contribution made by the travel and tourism industry. The founding members provided investment and support to produce economic data that could demonstrate the importance of the industry. They shared an interest in ensuring greater interest from governments and policy-makers in order to ensure the success of travel and tourism.

Robert H Burns took over as chairman of the WTTC in 1993, at which time there were 68 members. It began releasing tourism impact information around the same time, working with Wharton Econometric Forecasting Associates to develop the data. The WTTC formed a group known as the Tourism Satellite Account (TSA) to compile and release the data. The TSA was recognized by the United Nations Statistical Commission in 1999. During the 1990s, the WTTC expanded the activities of the council to include education and training, air transport liberalisation, taxation, and sustainable development. The new activities led to the creation of the World Travel & Tourism Human Resources Centre in Vancouver and the World Travel & Tourism Taxation Policy Centre in the United States.

In 1997, the WTTC organised the first Global Travel and Tourism Summit in Vilamoura, Portugal. Membership in the organisation reached 100 the same year. Two more summits were held in Vilamoura in 2000 and 2003, which were followed with annual meetings held in various locations.

In 2013, the WTTC created the Hotel Carbon Measurement Initiative in partnership with the International Tourism Partnership.

== Organisation and membership ==
The WTTC is headquartered in London. The staff are led by the president and CEO of WTTC. Seven directors head the different sections of the organisation. The WTTC members are the chief executives, presidents, or chairs of companies from different sectors and regions within the travel and tourism industry. The WTTC has two membership types: global members and regional members. It also has a category for companies that provide services to the industry, referred to as Industry Partnership.

=== Current and past presidents ===
- 1990–2001: Geoffrey Lipman
- 2001–2010: Jean-Claude Baumgarten
- 2010–2017: David P. Scowsill
- 2017–2021: Gloria Guevara Manzo
- 2021–2025: Julia Simpson
- 2025 - present: Gloria Guevara Manzo

== Activities ==
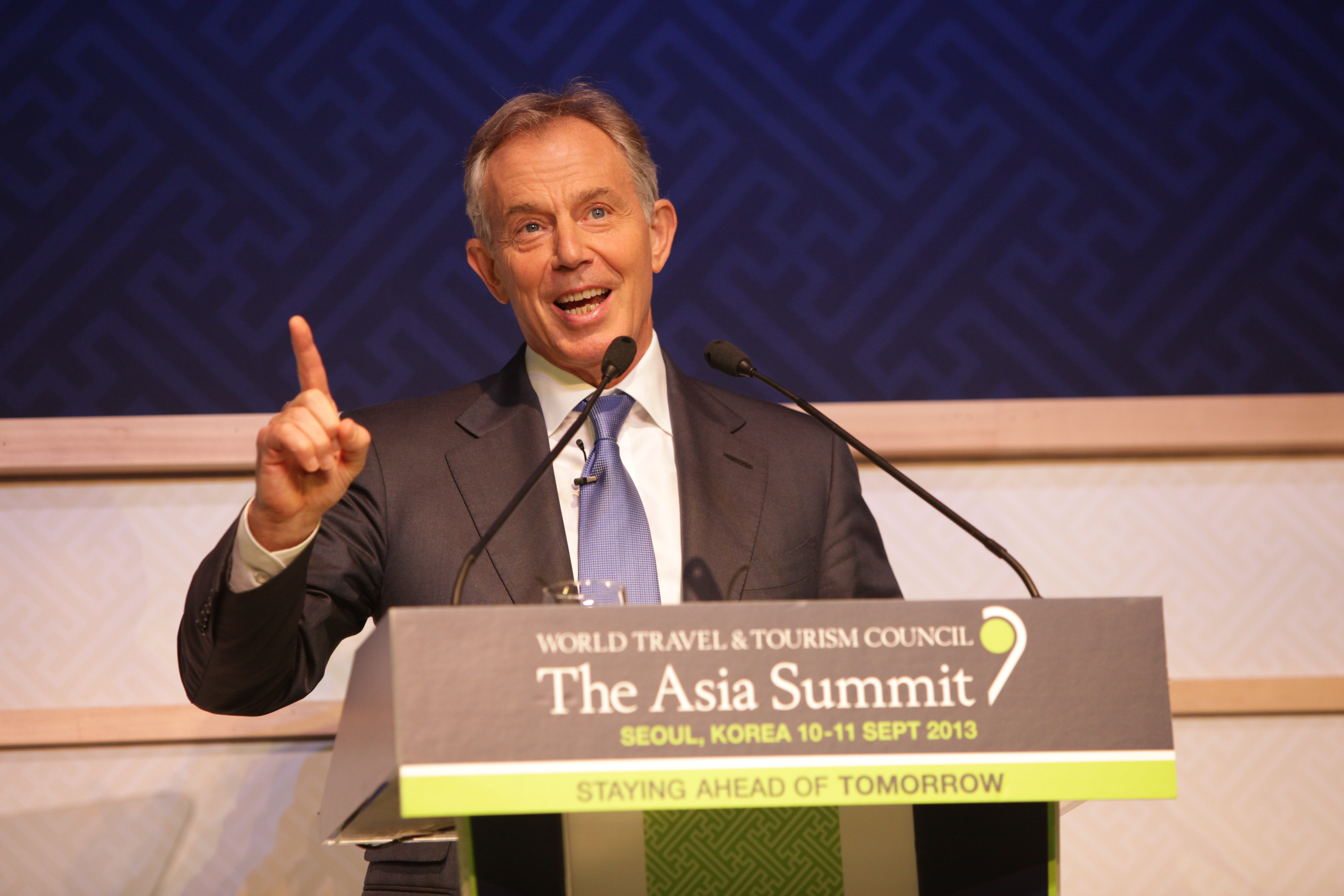
Tony Blair speaking at the WTTC Asia Summit in South Korea in 2013

=== Research ===
The WTTC performs and publishes research in conjunction with Oxford Economics on the economic and social impact of the travel and tourism industry. The foundation of the WTTC's research activity is a set of annually produced Travel & Tourism Economic Impact Reports. These include a global report as well as 24 regional and 184 country reports. The reports calculate the economic impact of the industry including the direct and total GDP impacts, direct and indirect employment, investment, and exports. Using models based on Tourism Satellite Accounting, the council reports one year and ten year forecasts for these impacts. This research is used by major publications including Forbes and Bloomberg News. It also supplies country indicators for the Travel and Tourism Competitiveness Report, a report published by the World Economic Forum that ranks selected nations according to the Travel and Tourism Competitiveness Index.

=== Summits ===
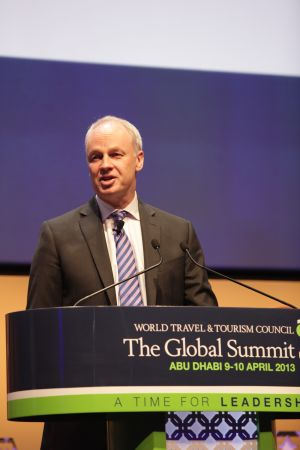
David Scowsill speaking at the 2013 Global Summit, Abu Dhabi

The WTTC organises a global summit each year, usually held in April, with a regional summit held sometime in the third quarter, with up to 1,000 individuals attending each year. Summit attendance is by invitation only.

=== Awards ===
International jury of experts mainly from WTTC founded in 1993, the annual World Travel Awards.

In 2004, the WTTC took over the Tourism for Tomorrow Awards. These awards were initially created by the Federation of Tour Operators in 1989 and taken over by British Airways in 1992. The Tourism for Tomorrow Awards are awarded in several categories to encourage and acknowledge developments in sustainable tourism.

== See also ==
- World Tourism Organization
