= Travel and Tourism Development Index =

International ranking by the WEF

Cover of the 2008 report

The Travel and Tourism Development Index (TTDI), formerly known as the Travel and Tourism Competitiveness Index (TTCI), is an index developed by the World Economic Forum (WEF) to measure the attractiveness and potential of countries for investment and development in the travel and tourism sector, rather than its attractiveness purely as a tourist destination. First published in 2007 under the title Travel and Tourism Competitiveness Report, the index was rebranded as the TTDI starting with the 2021 report.

The TTDI evaluates countries based on their performance across three main subindexes: regulatory framework; business environment and infrastructure; and human, cultural, and natural resources. Countries are scored on a scale from 1 to 6 in these categories, with the aggregated results forming the overall index.

In addition to rankings, the report includes detailed country profiles, featuring key indicators sourced from organizations such as the World Bank, the World Tourism Organization, and the World Travel and Tourism Council.

== Variables ==
For the 2008 index, each of the three main subindexes is made of the scoring of the following 14 variables, called pillars in the TTC Report. Several changes were introduced in the 2008 TTCI in the definition of the variables as compared to the definitions of the 2007 TTCI. First, the “environmental regulation” pillar was improved with help from the IUCN and the UNWTO, and for the 2008 index was renamed the “environmental sustainability” pillar to “better reflect its components and to capture the increasingly recognized importance of sustainability in the sector’s development.” Second, the original pillar “natural and cultural resources” was divided into two separate subcomponents: “natural resources” and “cultural resources”, thus, allowing to differentiate those countries which do not necessarily have the same strengths or weaknesses in these two different resources. In general, the model was improved with better data and new concepts were introduced. The 2009 and 2011 reports kept the same 14 variables.

Pillars by Subindexes (2021–)
- Subindex A: Enabling Environment
  - Pillar 1: Business Environment
  - Pillar 2: Safety and Security
  - Pillar 3: Health and Hygiene
  - Pillar 4: Human Resources and Labour Market Qualification of the labour force
  - Pillar 5: ICT Readiness
- Subindex B: T&T Policy and Enabling Conditions
  - Pillar 6: Prioritization of T&T
  - Pillar 7: International Openness
  - Pillar 8: Price Competitiveness
- Subindex C: Infrastructure
  - Pillar 9: Air Transport Infrastructure
  - Pillar 10: Ground and Port Infrastructure
  - Pillar 11: Tourist Service Infrastructure
- Subindex D: T&T Demand Drivers
  - Pillar 12: Natural Resources
  - Pillar 13: Cultural Resources
  - Pillar 14: Non-Leisure Resources
- Subindex E: T&T Sustainability
  - Pillar 15: Environmental Sustainability Climate Change Exposure and Management
  - Pillar 16: Socioeconomic Resilience and Conditions
  - Pillar 17: T&T Demand Pressure and Impact

Pillars by Subindexes (2015–)
- SUBINDEX A: ENABLING ENVIRONMENT
  - Pillar 1: Business Environment
  - Pillar 2: Safety and Security
  - Pillar 3: Health and Hygiene
  - Pillar 4: Human Resources and Labour Market
  - Pillar 5: ICT Readiness
- SUBINDEX B: T&T POLICY AND ENABLING CONDITIONS
  - Pillar 6: Prioritization of Travel & Tourism
  - Pillar 7: International Openness
  - Pillar 8: Price Competitiveness
  - Pillar 9: Environmental Sustainability
- SUBINDEX C: INFRASTRUCTURE
  - Pillar 10: Air Transport Infrastructure
  - Pillar 11: Ground and Port Infrastructure
  - Pillar 12: Tourist Service Infrastructure
- SUBINDEX D: NATURAL AND CULTURAL RESOURCES
  - Pillar 13: Natural Resources
  - Pillar 14: Cultural Resources and Business Travel

Pillars by Subindexes (–2013)
Regulatory framework	Business environment and infrastructure	Human, cultural, and natural resources
Policy rules and regulations	Air transport infrastructure	Human resources
Environmental sustainability	Ground transport infrastructure	Affinity for Travel & Tourism
Safety and security	Tourism infrastructure	Natural resources
Health and hygiene	Information and Communications Techn. infrastr.	Cultural resources
Prioritization of Travel and Tourism	Price competitiveness in T&T industry	

== 2023 ranking ==
Top 30 countries:

1. United States 5.24
2. Spain 5.18
3. Japan 5.09
4. France 5.07
5. Australia 5.00
6. Germany 5.00
7. United Kingdom 4.96
8. China 4.94
9. Italy 4.90
10. Switzerland 4.81
11. Canada 4.81
12. Portugal 4.78
13. Singapore 4.76
14. South Korea 4.74
15. Austria 4.65
16. Netherlands 4.64
17. Denmark 4.63
18. United Arab Emirates 4.62
19. Sweden 4.57
20. Finland 4.52
21. Greece 4.52
22. Indonesia 4.46
23. Belgium 4.45
24. Ireland 4.44
25. New Zealand 4.41
26. Brazil 4.41
27. Poland 4.40
28. Luxembourg 4.40
29. Turkey 4.39
30. Cyprus 4.37

== 2021 ranking ==
Top 30 countries:

1. Japan 5.2
2. United States 5.2
3. Spain 5.2
4. France 5.1
5. Germany 5.1
6. Switzerland 5
7. Australia 5
8. United Kingdom 5
9. Singapore 5
10. Italy 4.9
11. Austria 4.9
12. China 4.9
13. Canada 4.9
14. Netherlands 4.9
15. South Korea 4.8
16. Portugal 4.8
17. Denmark 4.7
18. Finland 4.7
19. Hong Kong 4.6
20. Sweden 4.6
21. Luxembourg 4.6
22. Belgium 4.6
23. Iceland 4.5
24. Ireland 4.5
25. United Arab Emirates 4.5
26. Czech Republic 4.5
27. New Zealand 4.5
28. Greece 4.5
29. Estonia 4.4
30. Poland 4.4

== 2019 ranking ==
Top 30 countries:

1. Spain 5.4
2. France 5.4
3. Germany 5.4
4. Japan 5.4
5. United States 5.3
6. United Kingdom 5.2
7. Australia 5.1
8. Italy 5.1
9. Canada 5.1
10. Switzerland 5.0
11. Austria 5.0
12. Portugal 4.9
13. China 4.9
14. Hong Kong 4.8
15. Netherlands 4.8
16. South Korea 4.8
17. Singapore 4.8
18. New Zealand 4.7
19. Mexico 4.7
20. Sweden 4.6
21. Denmark 4.6
22. Norway 4.6
23. Luxembourg 4.6
24. Belgium 4.5
25. Greece 4.5
26. Ireland 4.5
27. Croatia 4.5
28. Finland 4.5
29. Malaysia 4.5
30. Iceland 4.5

== 2017 ranking ==
Top 30 countries

1. Spain 5.43
2. France 5.32
3. Germany 5.28
4. Japan 5.26
5. United Kingdom 5.20
6. United States 5.12
7. Australia 5.10
8. Italy 4.99
9. Canada 4.97
10. Switzerland 4.94
11. Hong Kong 4.86
12. Austria 4.86
13. Singapore 4.85
14. Portugal 4.74
15. China 4.72
16. New Zealand 4.68
17. Netherlands 4.64
18. Norway 4.64
19. South Korea 4.57
20. Sweden 4.55
21. Belgium 4.54
22. Mexico 4.54
23. Ireland 4.53
24. Greece 4.51
25. Iceland 4.50
26. Malaysia 4.50
27. Brazil 4.49
28. Luxembourg 4.49
29. United Arab Emirates 4.49
30. Taiwan 4.47

== 2015 ranking ==
Top 30 countries:

1. Spain 5.31
2. France 5.24
3. Germany 5.22
4. United Kingdom 5.12
5. United States 5.12
6. Switzerland 4.99
7. Australia 4.98
8. Italy 4.98
9. Japan 4.94
10. Canada 4.92
11. Singapore 4.86
12. Austria 4.82
13. Hong Kong 4.68
14. Netherlands 4.67
15. Portugal 4.64
16. New Zealand 4.64
17. China 4.54
18. Iceland 4.54
19. Ireland 4.53
20. Norway 4.52
21. Belgium 4.51
22. Finland 4.47
23. Sweden 4.45
24. United Arab Emirates 4.43
25. Malaysia 4.41
26. Luxembourg 4.38
27. Denmark 4.38
28. Brazil 4.37
29. South Korea 4.37
30. Mexico 4.36
31. Greece 4.36

== 2013 ranking ==
Top 30 countries:

1. Switzerland 5.66
2. Germany 5.39
3. Austria 5.39
4. Spain 5.38
5. United Kingdom 5.38
6. United States 5.32
7. France 5.31
8. Canada 5.28
9. Sweden 5.24
10. Singapore 5.23
11. Australia 5.17
12. New Zealand 5.17
13. Netherlands 5.14
14. Japan 5.13
15. Hong Kong 5.11
16. Iceland 5.10
17. Finland 5.10
18. Belgium 5.04
19. Ireland 5.01
20. Portugal 5.01
21. Denmark 4.98
22. Norway 4.95
23. Luxembourg 4.93
24. Malta 4.92
25. South Korea 4.91
26. Italy 4.90
27. Barbados 4.88
28. United Arab Emirates 4.86
29. Cyprus 4.84
30. Estonia 4.82

== 2011 ranking ==
Top 30 countries:

1. Switzerland 5.68
2. Germany 5.60
3. Austria 5.41
4. France 5.41
5. Sweden 5.34
6. United States 5.30
7. United Kingdom 5.30
8. Spain 5.29
9. Canada 5.29
10. Singapore 5.23
11. Iceland 5.19
12. Hong Kong 5.19
13. Australia 5.15
14. Netherlands 5.13
15. Luxembourg 5.08
16. Denmark 5.05
17. Finland 5.02
18. Portugal 5.01
19. New Zealand 5.00
20. Norway 4.98
21. Ireland 4.98
22. Japan 4.94
23. Belgium 4.92
24. Cyprus 4.89
25. Estonia 4.88
26. Malta 4.88
27. Italy 4.87
28. Barbados 4.84
29. Greece 4.78
30. United Arab Emirates 4.78

== 2009 ranking ==
Top 20 countries:

1. Switzerland 5.68
2. Austria 5.46
3. Germany 5.41
4. France 5.34
5. Canada 5.32
6. Spain 5.29
7. Sweden 5.28
8. United States 5.28
9. Australia 5.24
10. Singapore 5.24
11. United Kingdom 5.22
12. Hong Kong 5.18
13. Netherlands 5.09
14. Denmark 5.08
15. Finland 5.07
16. Iceland 5.07
17. Portugal 5.01
18. Ireland 4.99
19. Norway 4.97
20. New Zealand 4.94

== 2008 ranking ==
Top 20 countries:

1. Switzerland 5.63
2. Austria 5.43
3. Germany 5.41
4. Australia 5.34
5. Spain 5.30
6. United Kingdom 5.28
7. United States 5.28
8. Sweden 5.27
9. Canada 5.26
10. France 5.23
11. Iceland 5.16
12. Finland 5.11
13. Denmark 5.10
14. Hong Kong 5.09
15. Portugal 5.09
16. Singapore 5.06
17. Norway 5.05
18. Netherlands 5.01
19. New Zealand 4.96
20. Luxembourg 4.95
