= Camino de Costa Rica =

Hiking trail across Costa Rica

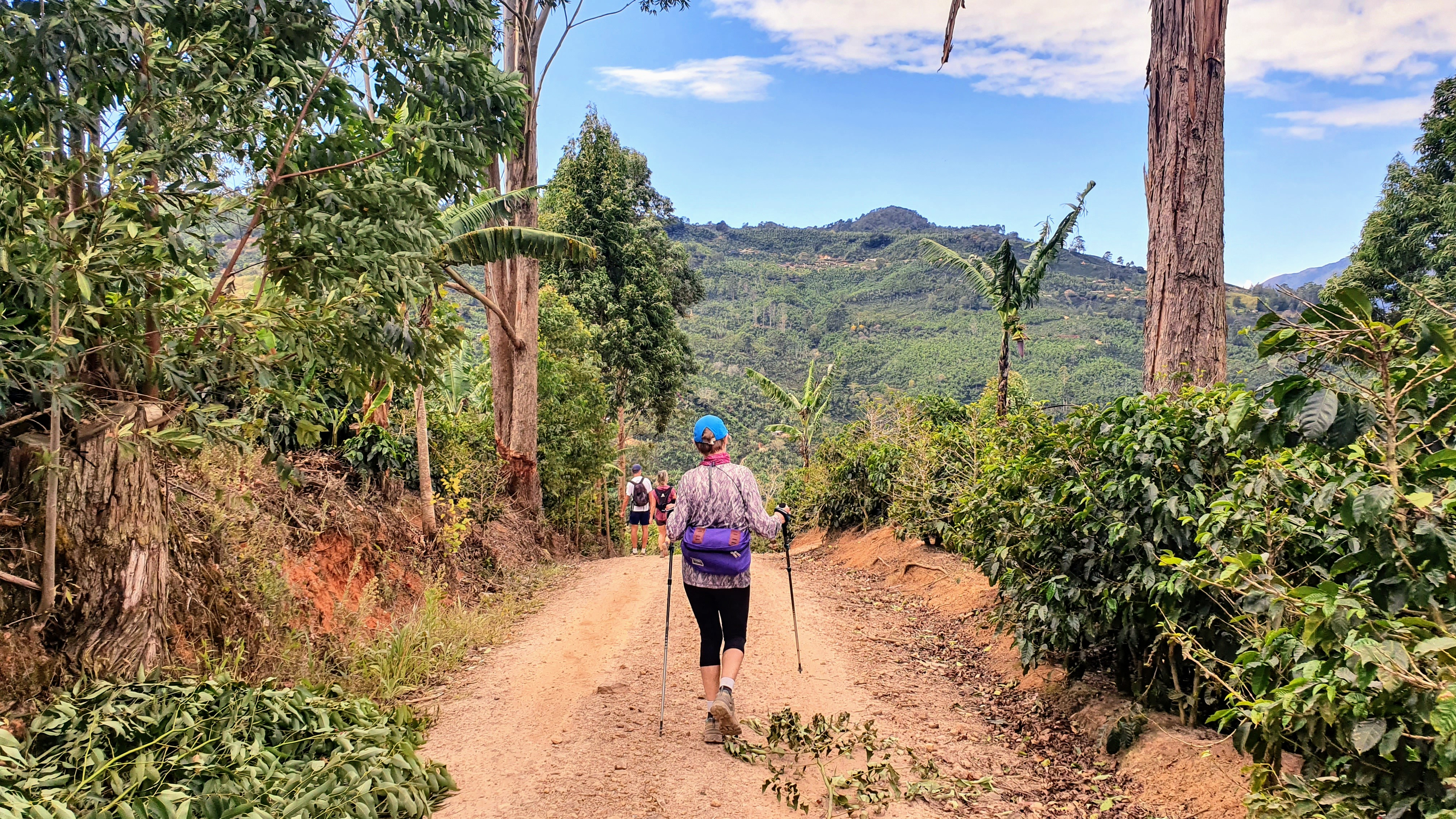
- Hike across coffee plantations
- Length: 280 kilometres (170 miles)
- Location: Costa Rica
- Established: 2018
- Trailheads: Barra de Parismina to Quepos
- Use: Hiking
- Elevation gain/loss: 19,099 feet (5,820 m) gain in, 19,068 feet (5,810 m) gain out
- Highest point: El Empalme, Los Santos Zone, 7,154 ft (2,181 m)
- Lowest point: 3 ft (0.91 m)
- Grade: Max: 17.6% - 25% Avg: 4.1% - 4.7%
- Months: Year round
- Sights: Indigenous territories, national parks, volcanoes, Atlantic and Pacific oceans.
- Surface: Dirt
- Website: https://www.caminodecostarica.org

Trail map
- Map of the route over Costa Rica.

The Camino de Costa Rica (Way of Costa Rica) is a 280 kilometres (170 miles) long hiking trail across Costa Rica. It runs from the Atlantic Ocean (Caribbean coast), the southernmost part of the Tortuguero canals, up the mountain and through indigenous territory near the Barbilla National Park and through valleys and mountain ranges of the central region of the country, just south of the Turrialba and Irazu volcanoes and through the Los Santos coffee region down to the Pacific coast in Quepos.

== History ==
By 2018, the rural population had declined from 40% inhabitants (2000) to 27% inhabitants, poverty at 25% was significantly higher than among the urban population, and income was more than 40% lower. These sobering facts as well as other factors such as level of education, unemployment and underemployment in rural areas gave rise to the NGO, the Asociación Mar a Mar in year 2016. The aim of the Camino de Costa Rica is to establish a world class long-distance trail and through its success in bringing hikers from all over the world, to improve the economic situation in the rural areas of Costa Rica.

65% of foreign tourists in Costa Rica are interested in ecotourism, which focuses on the elements of sustainable tourism - with the aim of promoting the exchange of services, the creation of jobs, the fight against poverty and socio-economic growth and at the same time reduce the social, cultural and environmental negative effects of tourism.

== Contribution ==
By the end of 2018, income from tourism in the region (6 municipalities) had already increased by 30%. New supply services and accommodation were founded in 12 municipalities, and new services (visits to plantations, archaeological visits, nature observation ...) were created. The number of hiking expedition operators had also increased.

== Route ==
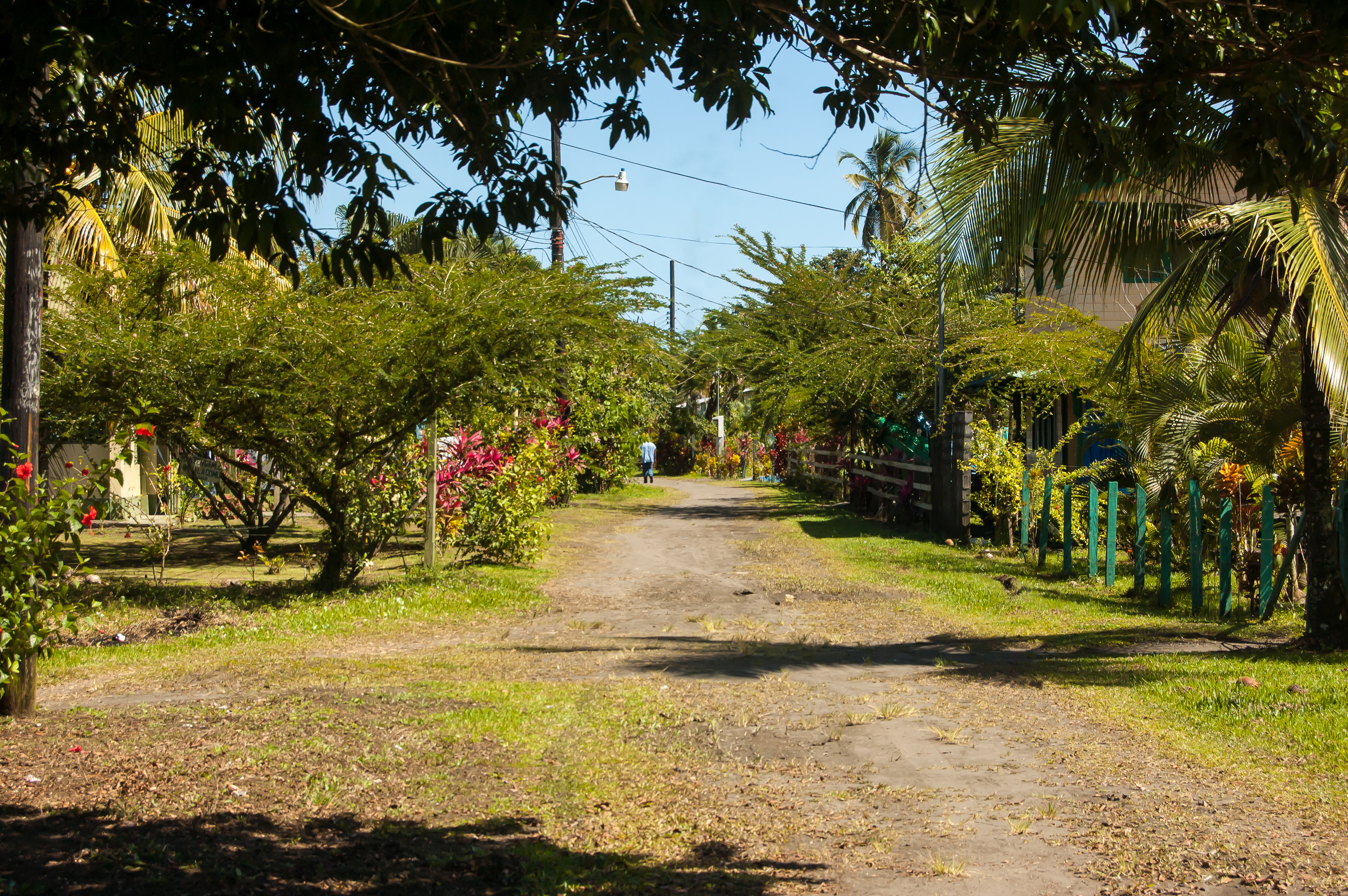
Parismina

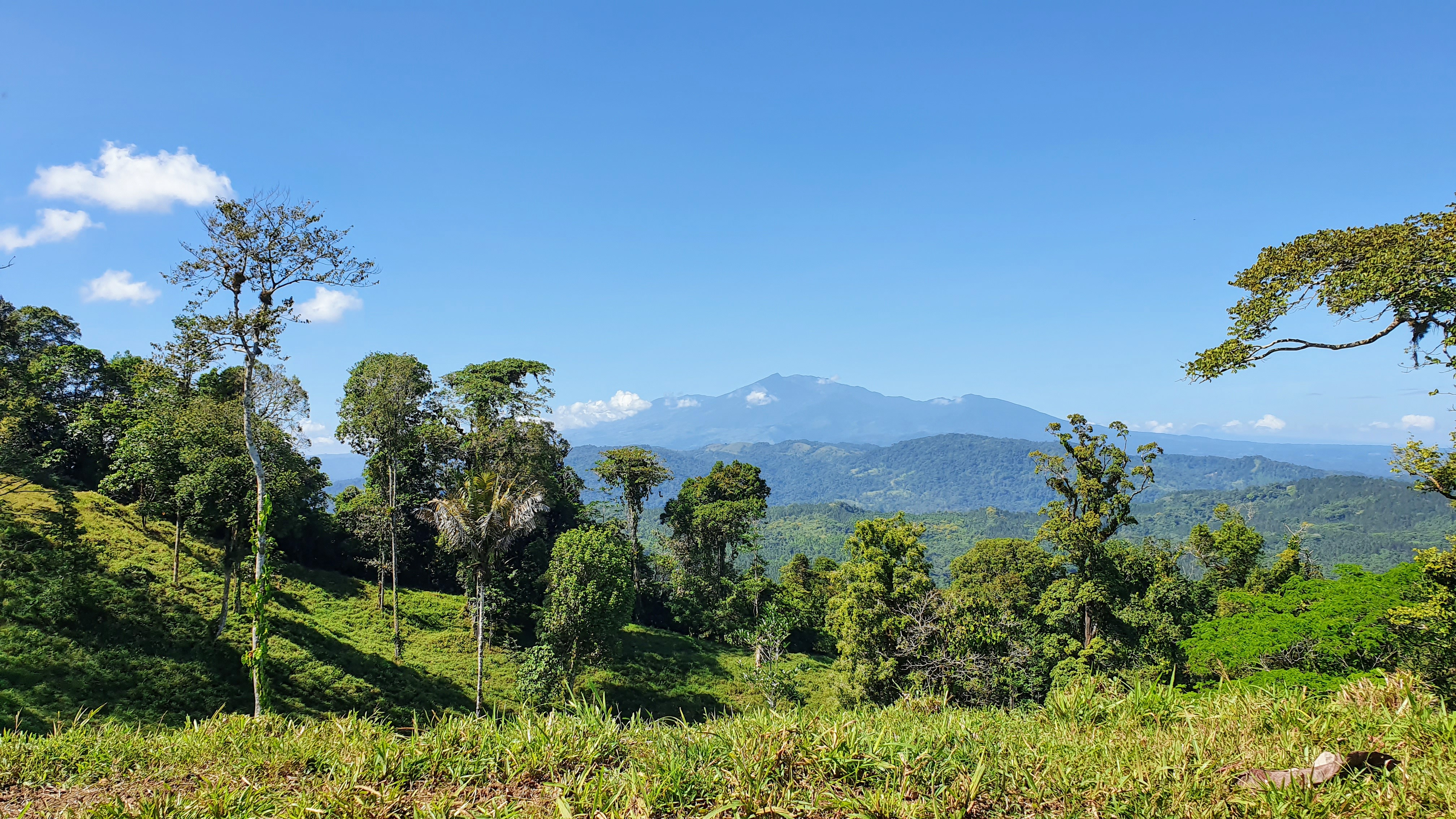
Turrialba Volcano

Hikers can begin the route of El Camino de Costa Rica from either the island village of Barra de Parismina or islands in the municipality of Barra de Pacuare. The coast can be accessed during the day from these locations. A short boat ride along canals leading from the Atlantic Ocean delivers hikers to the dock at Goshen, from which the trail continues on the mainland. The route crosses the Nairi-Awari Indigenous Territory, traverses the Pacuare River, enters the valley of Angostura Lagoon, follows a rural road along the edge of Tapantí National Park, descends into the Orosi Valley, and climbs up to its highest altitude of 7,154 feet (2,181 m) in the community of El Empalme. From there the trail weaves through the coffee fields of Tarrazú and the Los Santos Zone down to the city of Quepos on the Pacific coast. The northern volcanoes Turrialba and Irazú can be seen from afar over long stretches of the trail.

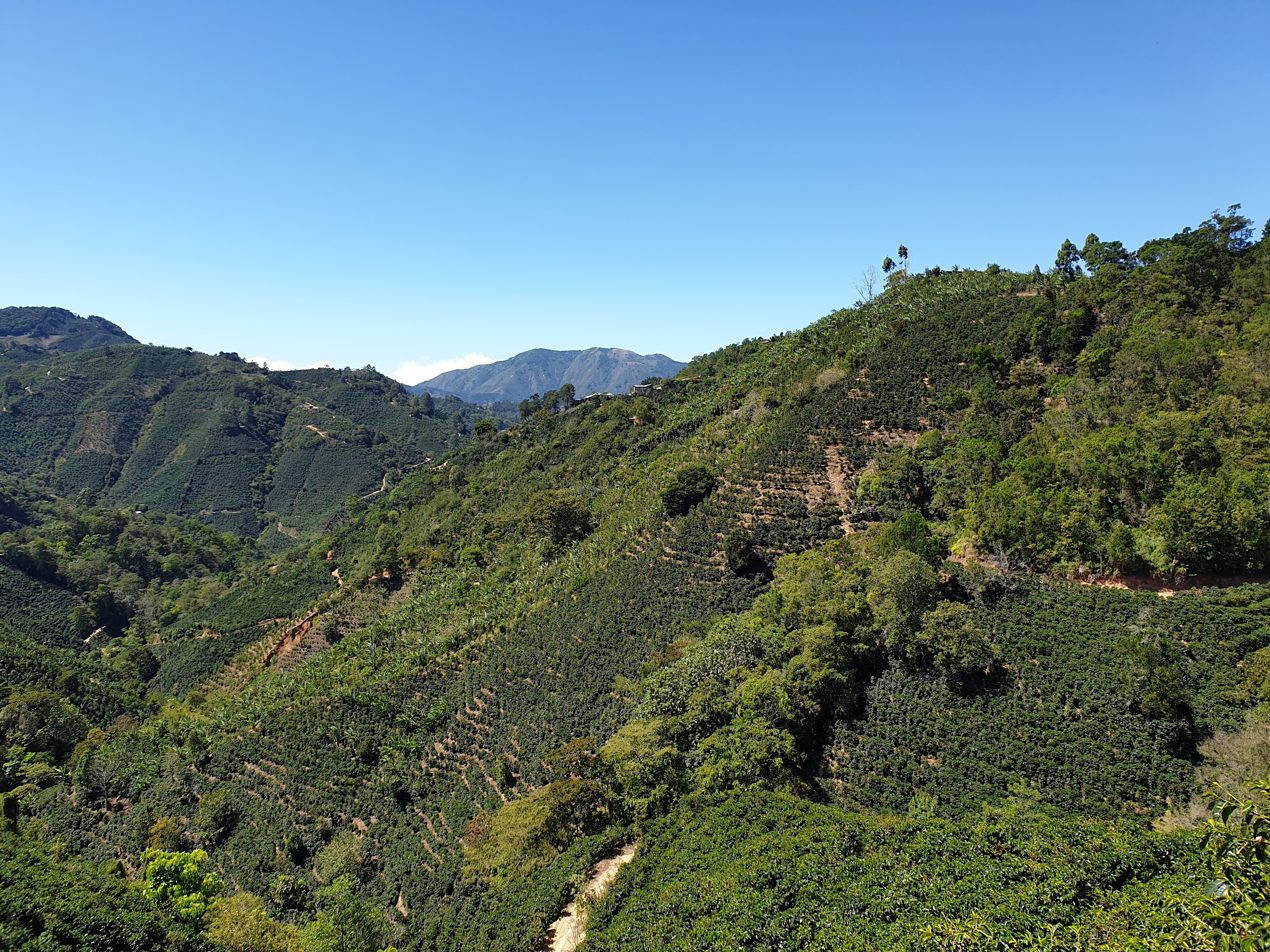
Coffee plantations

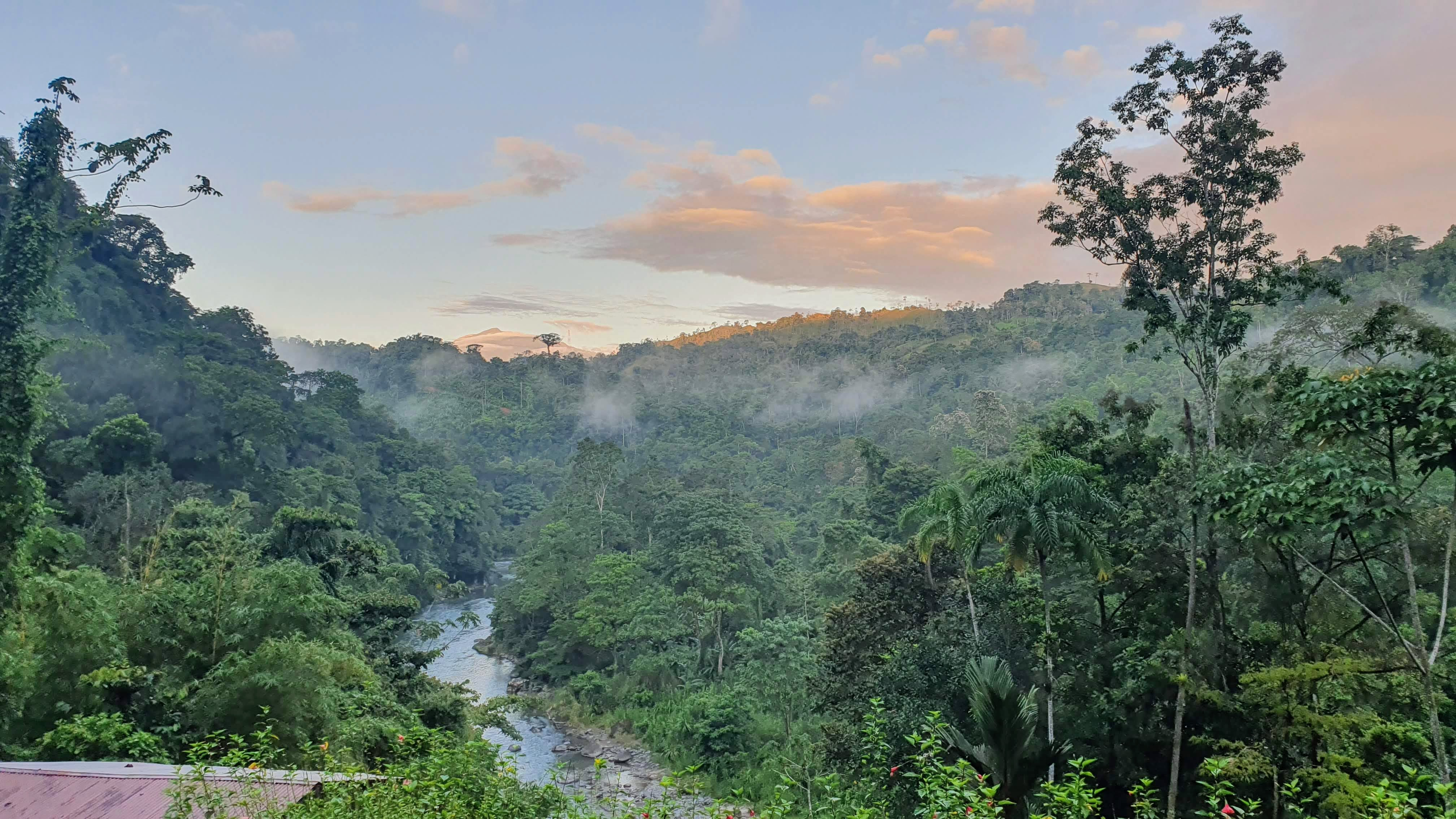
Turrialba Volcano and Pacuare River

Many local businesses offer guided tours like Urritrek of the trail, and facilitate lodging, meals, and other necessities. This includes arranging to have an Indigenous guide for the section that passes through Indigenous land: an Indigenous guide in this area is a requirement for any hiker. Those who desire to complete the route independently can use the El Camino de Costa Rica Hiking Guide, which includes descriptions of each section, along with maps, photographs of landmarks, resource contact information, methods for accessing the trail, and guidance on how to schedule an Indigenous guide where required.
