= Costa Rican oxcarts =

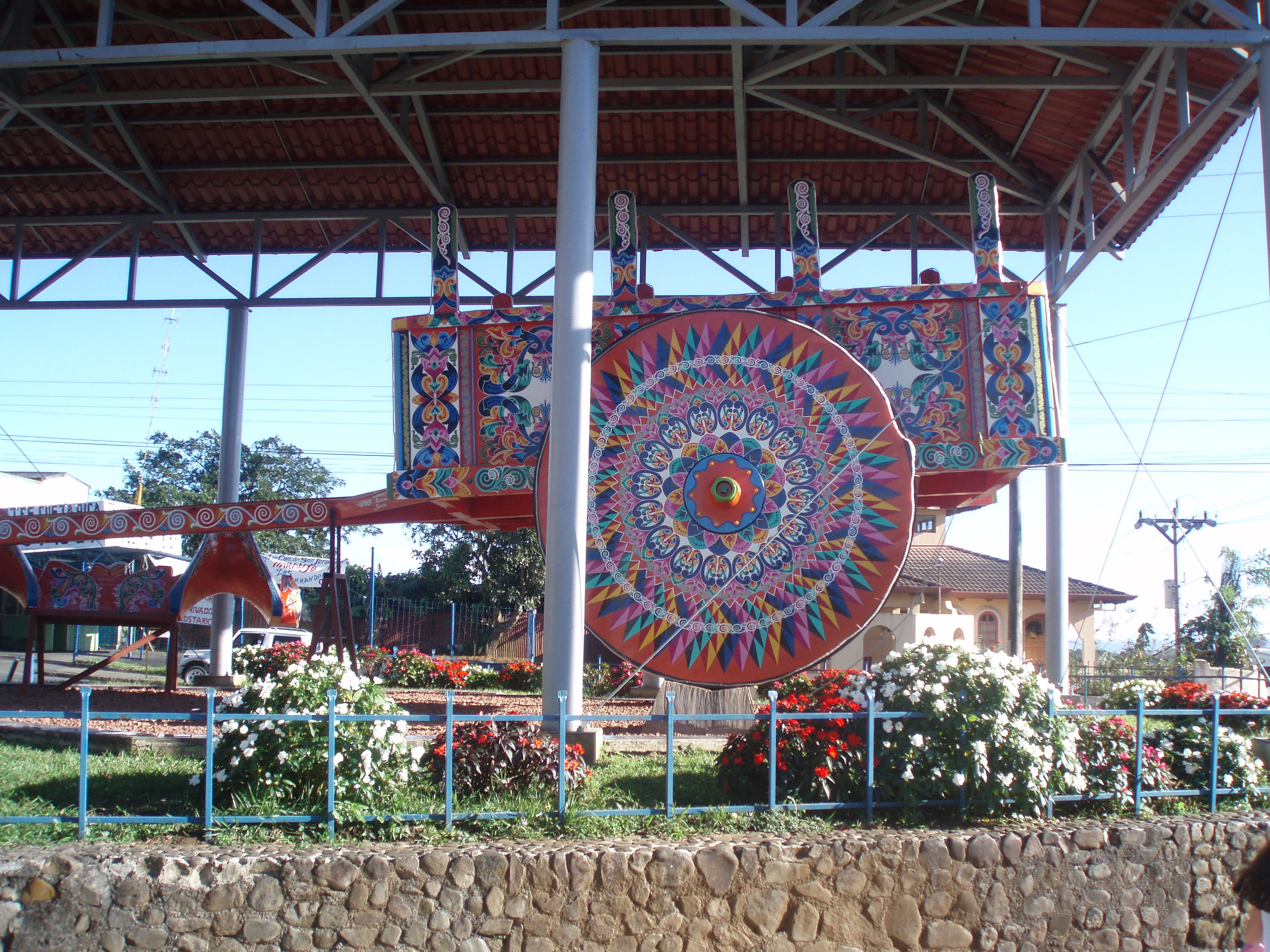
World's largest oxcart on display in Costa Rica

Costa Rican oxcarts, called carretas in Spanish, are a large part of Costa Rican history. They allowed for the expansion and increase of exports of many goods including Costa Rica's main export, coffee. It also is a huge part of Costa Rican culture today. The oxcarts are considered one of Costa Rica's national symbols.

== The Oxcart ==
Traditional Costa Rican oxcarts, known locally as “los boyeros”, are carts pulled by oxen as a means to transport of goods. They can have either two wheels or four and can be attached to oxen with a rope or chain. The front of the cart has a section where the driver and one passenger can sit and the back section has room for the cargo that needs to be transported. They can navigate through multiple different terrains including mountains, beaches, swamps, and rivers. Today, Costa Rican oxcarts are mainly used for celebrations and art rather than their original purpose, transporting goods. They are considered one of the traditional and cultural icons for Costa Rica.

== History ==
Originally, Spanish colonizers brought the design of the oxcart to Costa Rica as a tool to assist with transportation and work. But, the original design continually broke due to the different Costa Rican topography and climate. So during the 19th century, a new design was built to withstand these. Thus, the Costa Rican oxcart was created.

Its main use at that time was with the multiple coffee plantations across the country to transport coffee beans to ports to be shipped out on boats. This new cart allowed for the transportation of these beans across beaches, hills, mountains, and swamps due to its spoke-less wheels. These wheels were a hybrid between the disk used by the Aztec and the spoked wheel introduced by the Spanish. They allowed for better movement over the rough terrain. In addition, these oxcarts were the only means of transportation for many families and became a vital part of their lives.

The first shipment of coffee to London was transported from coffee plantations to Costa Rica's main port by oxcarts in 1843. Between 1844 and 1846, oxcarts also carried coffee to the province of Puntarenas in Costa Rica. These carts weren't originally pulled by oxen, they were pulled by people. As the coffee industry grew larger and larger, so did the need to use oxcarts for harvesting and transporting. The loads of coffee beans and goods also got larger, so they became too heavy for normal people to carry. So, these people were replaced by oxen. The golden age for the oxcarts was from 1850 to 1935.

Painting and decorating oxcarts began in the early 20th century, when each region in Costa Rica began creating its own design allowing for identification when in transportation. Then, cow herders began hand-painting their own oxcarts in addition to their identification designs. Many of these paintings included bright colors, geometric figures, and even portraits of people and beautiful landscapes. In 1903, people began enhancing their oxcarts by adding designs to their wheels. In 1915, the entire wheels were painted and decorated to create a distinct look for each family. Many times these designs would show the social status of the families.

Once the oxcart became a source of pride for many people, greater care was taken when crafting them like selecting the best-quality wood. Eventually, contests were held to award the “most creative and inspiring ox cart designs.” Many of these are still a part of tradition today. Many oxcarts were even designed to make its own ‘song’, a unique chime created when a metal ring strikes the hub nut of the wheel while going down the road.

After World War I, the oxcarts began to be replaced due to new inventions such as railways, tractors, and trucks. On March 22, 1988, La Carreta was designated the National Labor Symbol for Costa Rica. In addition on November 24, 2005, the typical oxcart was declared Intangible Cultural Heritage by UNESCO. “It is not an exaggeration to say that the Republic of Costa Rica was built with the strong tenacity of the oxcart. In each aspect of agricultural labor, the countrymen abide by the strength of their oxen, plowing the earth, hauling harvests, and bringing sugar cane to the mills. As a mode of transportation, the oxcart, always pulled by a pair of faithful oxen, took products to market, transported travelers, was an ambulance for the sick and, often the funeral car for the dead” wrote Michael Sims in his book La Carreta Pintada, The Painted Oxcart.

== Current oxcarts ==
Today, these carretas don't show much resemblance to the original rectangular carts that were covered by rawhide tarps. Though trucks and trains have replaced oxcarts, many farmers still stick to the old ways by using them during harvest season or when places are too rough for modern vehicles. They are still prominent in parades, festivals, and other large and small celebrations. The most famous of these takes place in San Antonio de Escazú, a town in San José, the 2nd Sunday of March every year. The Oxcart Drivers Day, Día de los Boyeros, has been celebrated for over 30 years. In 2014, over 200 sets of oxen and carts participated in the event.

Oxcarts are not only used in Costa Rica but also all around Central America. But, the Costa Rican oxcart stands out due to its unique and colorful patterns and shapes many times including even flowers, stars, and animals. Although many oxcarts are similar, no two are painted exactly the same. The art of painting these oxcarts has been passed down from generation to generation. It is common to see these oxcarts in gardens, and can also be found in more than 200 stores. These stores offer a variety of oxcarts in all kinds of sizes and colors.
