= Costa Rica =

Country in Central America

Republic of Costa Rica República de Costa Rica (Spanish)
- Flag Coat of arms
- Motto: "¡Vivan siempre el trabajo y la paz!" "May work and peace always live!"
- Anthem: Himno Nacional de Costa Rica "National Anthem of Costa Rica"
- Capital and largest city: San José; 9°56′N 84°5′W
- Official languages: Spanish
- Recognized regional languages: Mekatelyu; Bribri; Patois
- Ethnic groups (2021): 83.6% White or Mestizo; 6.7% Mulatto (mixed Black and White); 2.4% Indigenous; 1.1% Black; 6.2% others
- Religion (2021): 72.6% Christianity; 47.5% Catholicism (official); 22.5% Protestantism; 2.6% other Christian; 27.0% no religion; 0.4% others
- Demonyms: Costa Rican; Tico(a)
- Government: Unitary presidential republic
  - President: Laura Fernández
  - First Vice President: Francisco Gamboa
  - Second Vice President: Douglas Soto
- Legislature: Legislative Assembly

Independence
  - from Spain: 15 September 1821
  - from First Mexican Empire: 1 July 1823
  - from the Federal Republic of Central America: 14 November 1838
  - Recognized by Spain: 10 May 1850
  - Current constitution: 7 November 1949

Area
  - Total: 51,179.92 km^{2} (19,760.68 sq mi) (126th)
  - Water (%): 1.05 (as of 2015)

Population
  - 2026 estimate: ▲5,160,700 (127th)
  - 2022 census: 5,044,197
  - Density: 220/sq mi (84.9/km^{2}) (107th)
- GDP (PPP): 2026 estimate
  - Total: ▲$185.286 billion (90th)
  - Per capita: ▲$34,214 (66th)
- GDP (nominal): 2026 estimate
  - Total: ▲$115.254 billion (85th)
  - Per capita: ▲$21,282 (64th)
- Gini (2025): ▼45.5 medium inequality
- HDI (2023): ▲0.833 very high (62nd)
- Currency: Costa Rican colón (CRC)
- Time zone: UTC−6 (CST)
- Date format: dd/mm/yyyy
- Calling code: +506
- ISO 3166 code: CR
- Internet TLD: .cr.co.cr

Costa Rica, (Note: UK: /ˌkɒstə ˈriːkə/, US: /ˌkoʊstə-/ Spanish pronunciation: [kosta ˈrika]; literally "Rich Coast") officially the Republic of Costa Rica, (Note: Spanish: República de Costa Rica, [reˈpuβlika ðe ˈkosta ˈrika]) is a country in Central America. It borders Nicaragua to the north, the Caribbean Sea to the northeast, Panama to the southeast, and the Pacific Ocean to the southwest, sharing a maritime border with Ecuador to the south of Cocos Island. It has a population of around five million in a land area of nearly 51,180 km^{2} (19,760 sq mi); the capital and largest city is San José, home to around 350,000 residents and two million people in the surrounding metropolitan area.

Humans have been in Costa Rica since between 7,000 and 10,000 BC. Various indigenous peoples lived in the territory before it was colonized by Spain in the 16th century. Costa Rica was a peripheral colony of the Spanish Empire until independence in 1821 as part of the First Mexican Empire, followed by membership in the Federal Republic of Central America in 1823, from which it formally declared independence in 1847. The country underwent gradual modernization under relatively stable authoritarian rule until the late 19th century, when it promulgated a liberal constitution and held the first free and fair national election in Central America.

Following a brief civil war in 1948, Costa Rica adopted its current constitution in 1949, which granted universal suffrage, provided various social, economic, and educational guarantees for all citizens, and permanently abolished the army, becoming one of the few sovereign nations without a standing military. Costa Rica is a presidential republic with a robust and stable democracy. About one-fourth of the national budget is spent on education—which has been free and compulsory since 1886—equal to about 6.2% of the country's GDP, compared to a global average of 3.8%; the economy, once heavily dependent on agriculture, has diversified to include finance, corporate services for foreign companies, pharmaceuticals, and ecotourism.

Costa Rica has consistently performed favorably in the Human Development Index (HDI), placing 62nd globally, and fifth in Latin America, in 2023. Costa Rica is classified by the World Bank as a high-income economy and is the only OECD country in Central America and the Caribbean. It has been cited by the United Nations Development Programme (UNDP) as having attained much higher human development than other countries at the same income levels, with a better record on human development and inequality than the regional median. Costa Rica performs well in metrics of democratic governance, press freedom, subjective happiness and sustainable wellbeing; it has one of the highest literacy rates in the Americas, and is considered a regional leader in human rights and environmentalism.

== History ==
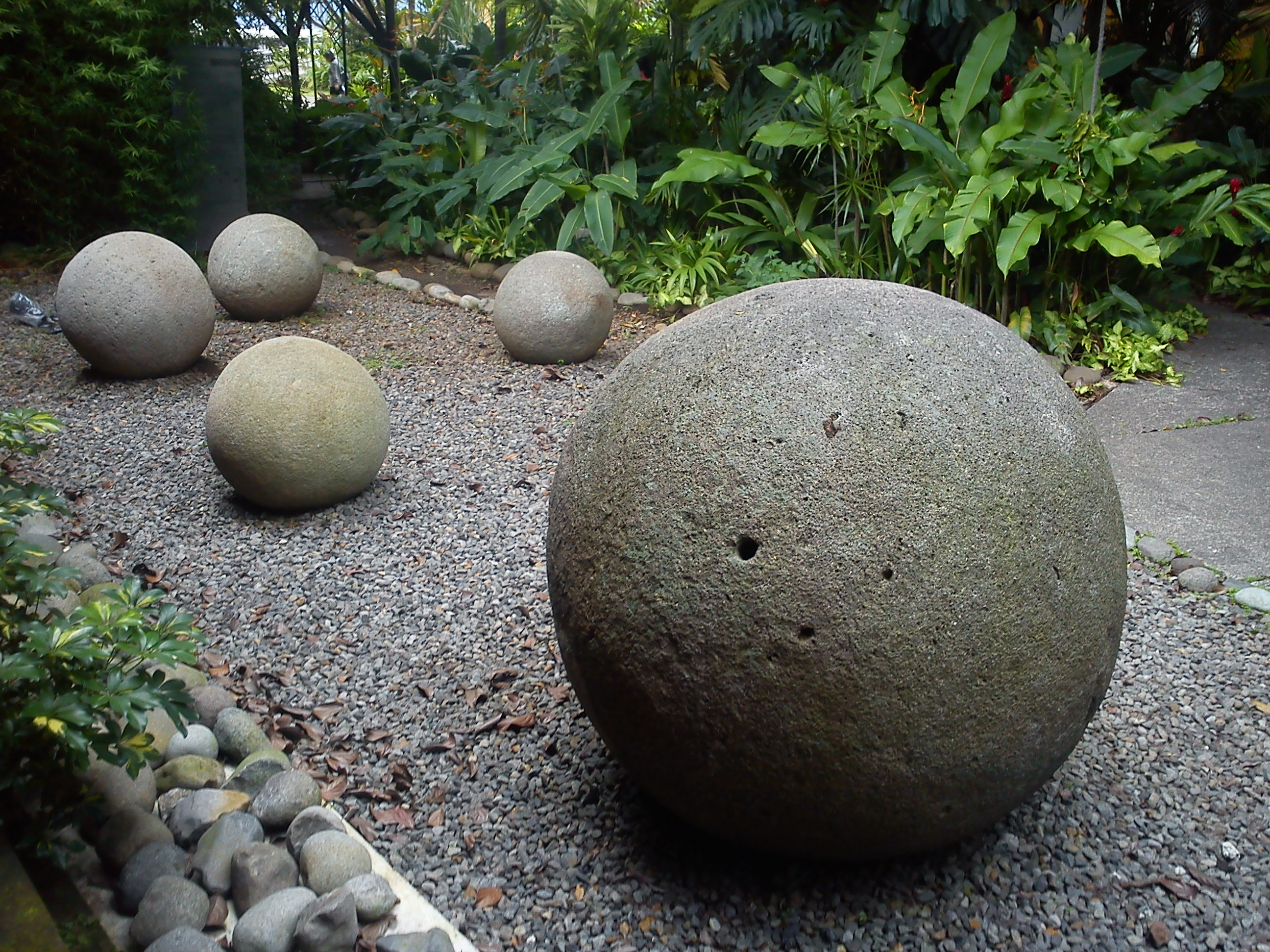
Stone spheres created by the Diquis culture at the National Museum of Costa Rica. The sphere is the icon of the country's cultural identity.

=== Pre-Columbian period ===
Historians have classified the Indigenous people of Costa Rica as belonging to the Intermediate Area, where the peripheries of the Mesoamerican and Andean native cultures overlapped. More recently, pre-Columbian Costa Rica has also been described as part of the Isthmo-Colombian Area.

Stone tools, the oldest evidence of human occupation in Costa Rica, are associated with the arrival of various groups of hunter-gatherers about 10,000 to 7,000 years BCE in the Turrialba Valley. The presence of Clovis culture type spearheads and arrows from South America opens the possibility that, in this area, two different cultures coexisted.

Agriculture became evident in the populations that lived in Costa Rica about 5,000 years ago. They mainly grew tubers and roots. For the first and second millennia BCE there were already settled farming communities. These were small and scattered, although the timing of the transition from hunting and gathering to agriculture as the main livelihood in the territory is still unknown.

The earliest use of pottery appears around 2,000 to 3,000 BCE. Shards of pots, cylindrical vases, platters, gourds, and other vases decorated with grooves, prints, and some modeled after animals have been found.

The influence of Indigenous peoples on modern Costa Rican culture has been relatively small compared to other nations since the country lacked a strong native civilization to begin with. Most of the native population was absorbed into the Spanish-speaking colonial society through inter-marriage, except for some small remnants, the most significant of which are the Bribri and Boruca tribes who still inhabit the mountains of the Cordillera de Talamanca, in the southeastern part of Costa Rica, near the frontier with Panama.

=== Spanish colonization ===
The name la costa rica, meaning "rich coast" in the Spanish language, was in some accounts first applied by Christopher Columbus, who sailed to the eastern shores of Costa Rica during his final voyage in 1502, and reported vast quantities of gold jewelry worn by natives. The name may also have come from conquistador Gil González Dávila, who landed on the west coast in 1522, encountered natives, and obtained some of their gold, sometimes by violent theft and sometimes as gifts from local leaders.

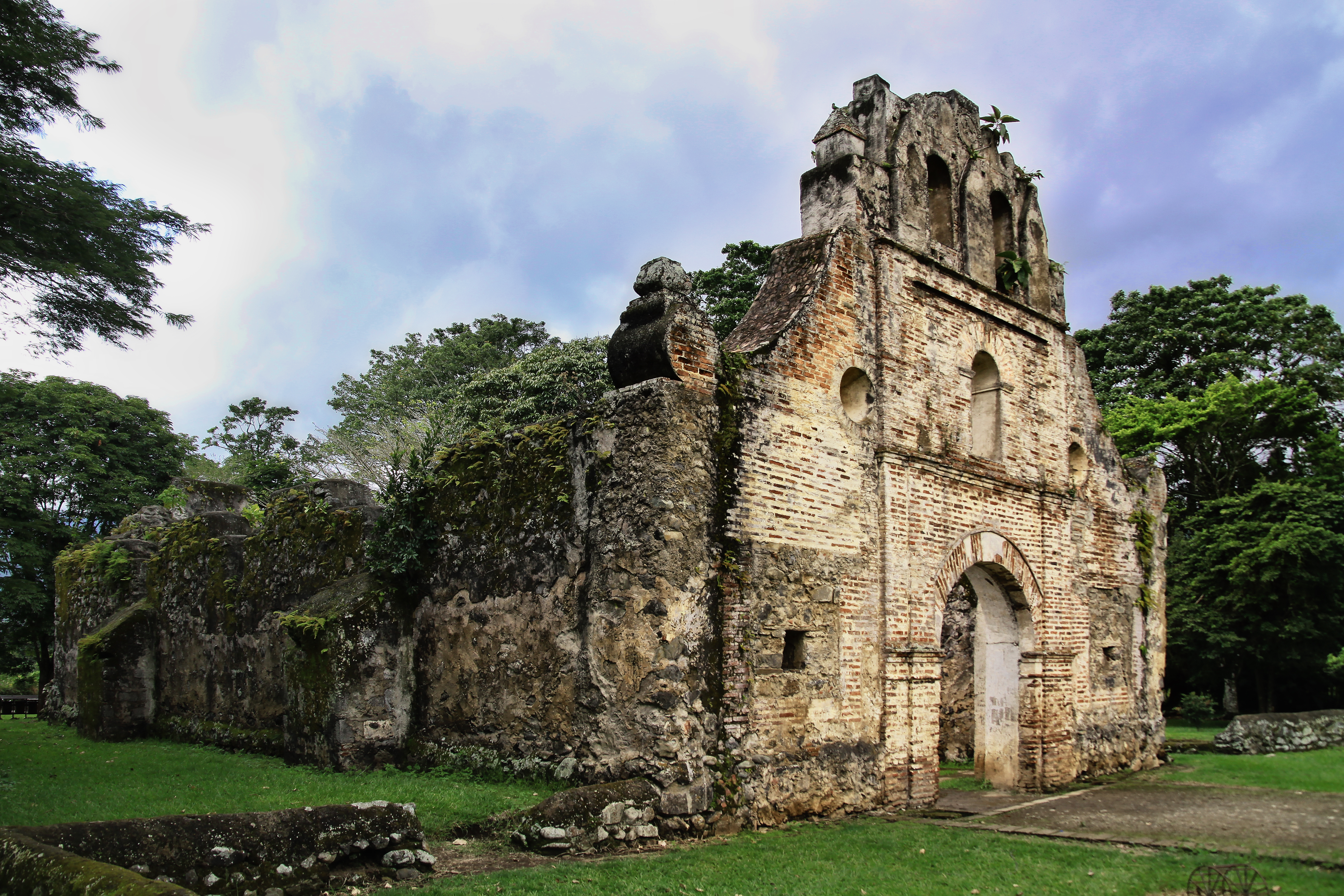
The Ujarrás historical site in the Orosí Valley, Cartago province. The church was built between 1686 and 1693.

During most of the colonial period, Costa Rica was the southernmost province of the Captaincy General of Guatemala, nominally part of the Viceroyalty of New Spain. The captaincy general was a largely autonomous entity within the Spanish Empire. Costa Rica's distance from the capital of the captaincy in Guatemala, its legal prohibition under mercantilist Spanish law from trade with its southern neighbor Panama, then part of the Viceroyalty of New Granada (i.e. Colombia), and lack of resources such as gold and silver, made Costa Rica into a poor, isolated, and sparsely inhabited region within the Spanish Empire. Costa Rica was described as "the poorest and most miserable Spanish colony in all America" by a Spanish governor in 1719.

=== Independence ===
Like the rest of Central America, Costa Rica never fought for independence from Spain. On 15 September 1821, after the final Spanish defeat in the Mexican War of Independence (1810–1821), the authorities in Guatemala declared the independence of all of Central America. That date is still celebrated as Independence Day in Costa Rica even though, technically, under the Spanish Constitution of 1812 that had been readopted in 1820, Nicaragua and Costa Rica had become an autonomous province with its capital in León.

On 3 March 1824, the government of the State of Costa Rica officially proposed to the municipality of Nicoya its voluntary incorporation into the country, through a document in which it invited it "if it was convenient to join its Province without going against its will." On 4 July, an open town hall was convened in Nicoya to discuss the matter, but attendees declined the invitation under the argument "that this Party... cannot be dissident."

On 25 July 1824, a second plebiscite was called in the city of Nicoya. After deliberation, the incorporation into Costa Rica was decided in an open town hall meeting, preparing a record in which the main reasons for it were noted, pointing out the advantages in terms of trade, the desire to participate in the advances that are palpable in Costa Rica, the economic, administrative and public service benefits, the creation of schools, security and quiet, referring to the state of war that Nicaragua was experiencing at that time and the fear that it would spread to the Partido populations, in addition to point out the poverty in which its towns find themselves and the geography of the territory as justifications for the union. Three days later, another similar plebiscite was held in Santa Cruz, with the same result. The election was by majority vote, with 77% of the Party's population in favor of incorporation, and 23% against it. The town of Guanacaste was the only one that declined annexation, due to the ties its residents had with the city of Rivas, Nicaragua.

Upon independence, Costa Rican authorities faced the issue of officially deciding the future of the country. Two bands formed: the Imperialists, defended by Cartago and Heredia cities, which were in favor of joining the Mexican Empire, and the Republicans, represented by the cities of San José and Alajuela who defended full independence. Because of the lack of agreement on these two possible outcomes, the first civil war in Costa Rica occurred. The Battle of Ochomogo took place on the Hill of Ochomogo, located in the Central Valley in 1823. The conflict was won by the Republicans and, as a consequence, the city of Cartago lost its status as the capital, which moved to San José.

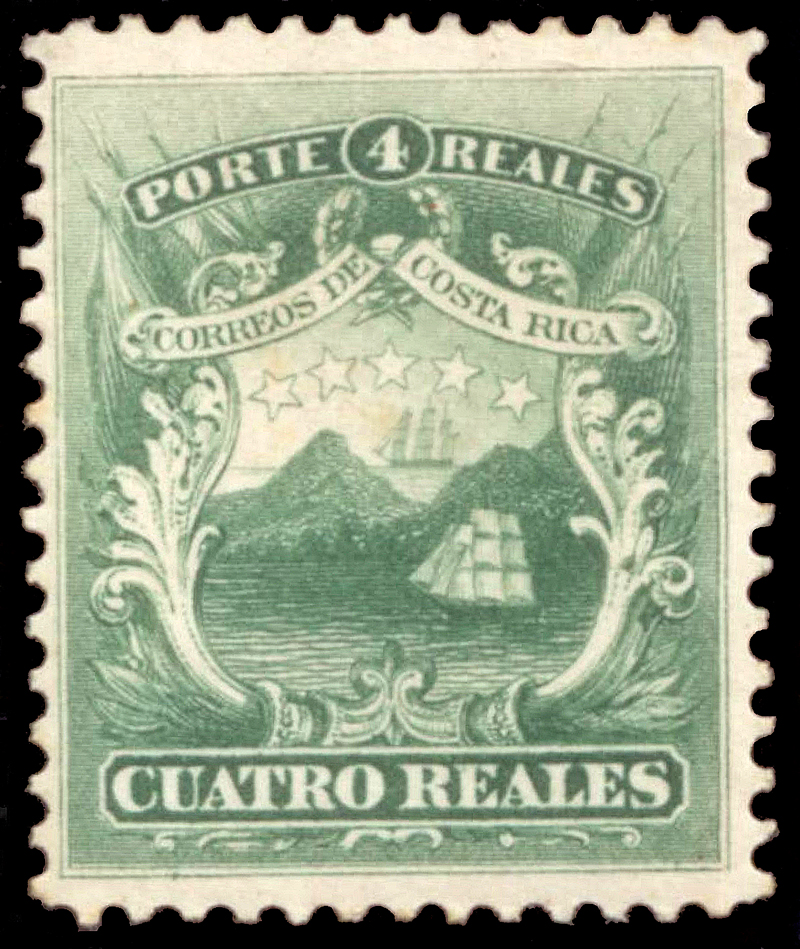
1849 national coat of arms was featured in the first postal stamp issued in 1862.

In 1838, long after the Federal Republic of Central America ceased to function in practice, Costa Rica formally withdrew and proclaimed itself sovereign. The considerable distance and poor communication routes between Guatemala City and the Central Plateau, where most of the Costa Rican population lived then and still lives now, meant the local population had little allegiance to the federal government in Guatemala. Since colonial times, Costa Rica has been reluctant to become economically tied with the rest of Central America. Even today, despite most of its neighbors' (Note: Guatemala, Honduras, El Salvador, Nicaragua, and Panama) efforts to increase regional integration, Costa Rica has remained more independent.

Until 1849, when it became part of Panama, Chiriquí was part of Costa Rica. Costa Rican pride was assuaged for the loss of this eastern (or southern) territory with the acquisition of Guanacaste, in the north.

=== Economic growth in the 19th century ===
Coffee was first planted in Costa Rica in 1808, and by the 1820s, it surpassed tobacco, sugar, and cacao as a primary export. Coffee production remained Costa Rica's principal source of wealth well into the 20th century, creating a wealthy class of growers, the so-called Coffee Barons. The revenue helped to modernize the country.

Most of the coffee exported was grown around the main centers of population in the Central Plateau and then transported by oxcart to the Pacific port of Puntarenas after the main road was built in 1846. By the mid-1850s the main market for coffee was Britain. It soon became a high priority to develop an effective transportation route from the Central Plateau to the Atlantic Ocean. For this purpose, in the 1870s, the Costa Rican government contracted with U.S. businessman Minor C. Keith to build a railroad from San José to the Caribbean port of Limón. Despite enormous difficulties with construction, disease, and financing, the railroad was completed in 1890.

Most Afro-Costa Ricans descend from Jamaican immigrants who worked in the construction of that railway and now make up about 3% of Costa Rica's population. U.S. convicts, Italians, and Chinese immigrants also participated in the construction project. In exchange for completing the railroad, the Costa Rican government granted Keith large tracts of land and a lease on the train route, which he used to produce bananas and export them to the United States. As a result, bananas came to rival coffee as the principal Costa Rican export, while foreign-owned corporations (including the United Fruit Company later) began to hold a major role in the national economy and eventually became a symbol of the exploitative export economy. The major labor dispute between the peasants and the United Fruit Company (The Great Banana Strike) was a major event in the country's history and was an important step that would eventually lead to the formation of effective trade unions in Costa Rica, as the company was required to sign a collective agreement with its workers in 1938.

=== 20th century ===
Historically, Costa Rica has generally enjoyed greater peace and more consistent political stability than many of its fellow Latin American nations. During the 20th century, however, Costa Rica experienced two significant periods of violence. In 1917–1919, General Federico Tinoco Granados ruled as a military dictator until he was overthrown and forced into exile. The unpopularity of Tinoco's regime led, after he was overthrown, to a considerable decline in the size, wealth, and political influence of the Costa Rican military. In 1948, José Figueres Ferrer led an armed uprising in the wake of a disputed presidential election between Rafael Ángel Calderón Guardia (who had been president between 1940 and 1944) and Otilio Ulate Blanco. With more than 2,000 dead, the resulting 44-day Costa Rican Civil War was the bloodiest event in Costa Rica during the 20th century.

The victorious rebels formed a government junta that abolished the military all together and oversaw the drafting of a new constitution by a democratically elected assembly. Having enacted these reforms, the junta transferred power to Ulate on 8 November 1949. After the coup d'état, Figueres became a national hero, winning the country's first democratic election under the new constitution in 1953. Starting in 1958, Costa Rica has held additional presidential elections every four years, the latest in 2026. With uninterrupted democracy dating back to at least 1948, the country is the region's most stable.

== Geography ==
Costa Rica map of Köppen climate classification

Costa Rica borders the Caribbean Sea to the east, and the Pacific Ocean to the west. Costa Rica also borders Nicaragua to the north and Panama to the south.

The highest point in the country is Cerro Chirripó, at 3,819 metres (12,530 ft). The highest volcano in the country is the Irazú Volcano (3,431 m or 11,257 ft) and the largest lake is Lake Arenal. There are 14 known volcanoes in Costa Rica, and six of them have been active in the last 75 years.

=== Climate ===
Costa Rica experiences a tropical climate year-round. There are two seasons. The dry season is December to April, and the rainy season is May to November. March and April are the hottest months in the country, while December and January are the coldest. However, there are rainy days in the dry season, as well as weeks without rain in the wet season.

Costa Rica is highly vulnerable to extreme weather events, which can be exacerbated by climate change. The majority of Costa Rica's population (78%) and economic activity (80% of GDP) are concentrated in regions highly vulnerable to various natural hazards, such as floods, landslides, cyclones, storm surges, and rising sea levels. The country is facing increasing temperatures (especially at higher elevations), rising sea levels on both coasts, and changing rainfall patterns resulting in increased risk of drought along the Pacific slope and flooding in all regions of the country. Increasing temperatures and extreme heat will have major consequences for human health, agriculture (particularly coffee and banana cultivation), water security, tourism, and the country's distinctive biodiversity and ecosystems.

=== Flora and fauna ===
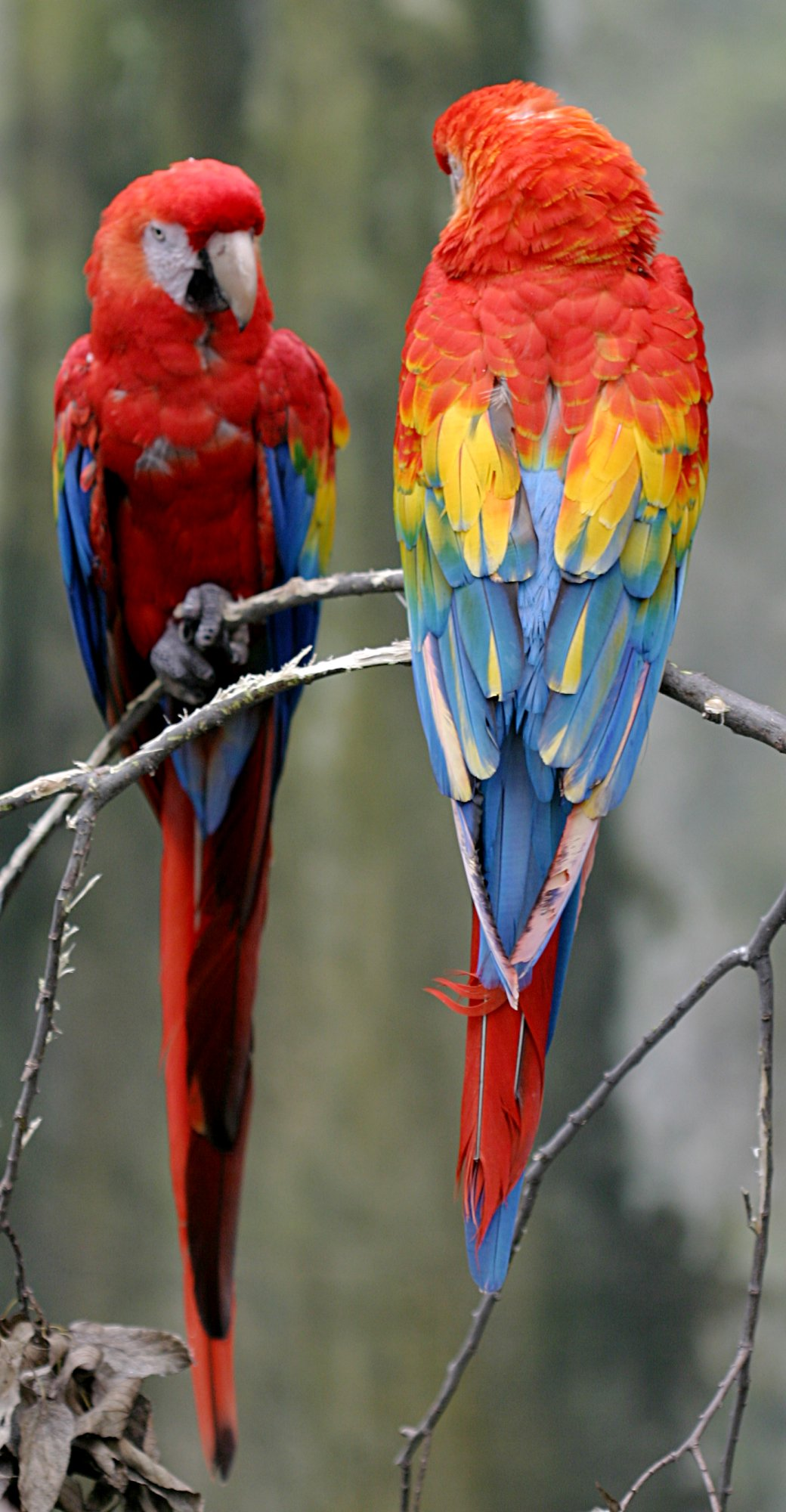
The scarlet macaw is native to Costa Rica.

Despite its size, Costa Rica is one of the countries with the greatest biodiversity in all of Latin America.

One national park, the Corcovado National Park, is internationally renowned among ecologists for its biodiversity (including big cats and tapirs) and is where visitors can expect to see an abundance of wildlife. Corcovado is the one park in Costa Rica where all four Costa Rican monkey species can be found. These include the white-headed capuchin, the mantled howler, the endangered Geoffroy's spider monkey, and the Central American squirrel monkey, found only on the Pacific coast of Costa Rica and a small part of Panama and considered endangered until 2008 when its status was upgraded to vulnerable. Deforestation, illegal pet trading, and hunting are the main reasons for its threatened status. La Amistad and Chirripó present the climate of the páramo, at a height of more than 3000 meters above sea level, providing other types of flora and fauna, such as the white-nosed coati, the sooty thrush and Rogiera amoena. Costa Rica is the first tropical country to have stopped and reversed deforestation; it has successfully restored its forestry and developed an ecosystem service to teach biologists and ecologists about its environmental protection measures. The country had a 2018 Forest Landscape Integrity Index mean score of 4.65/10, ranking it 118th globally out of 172 countries.

== Government and politics ==
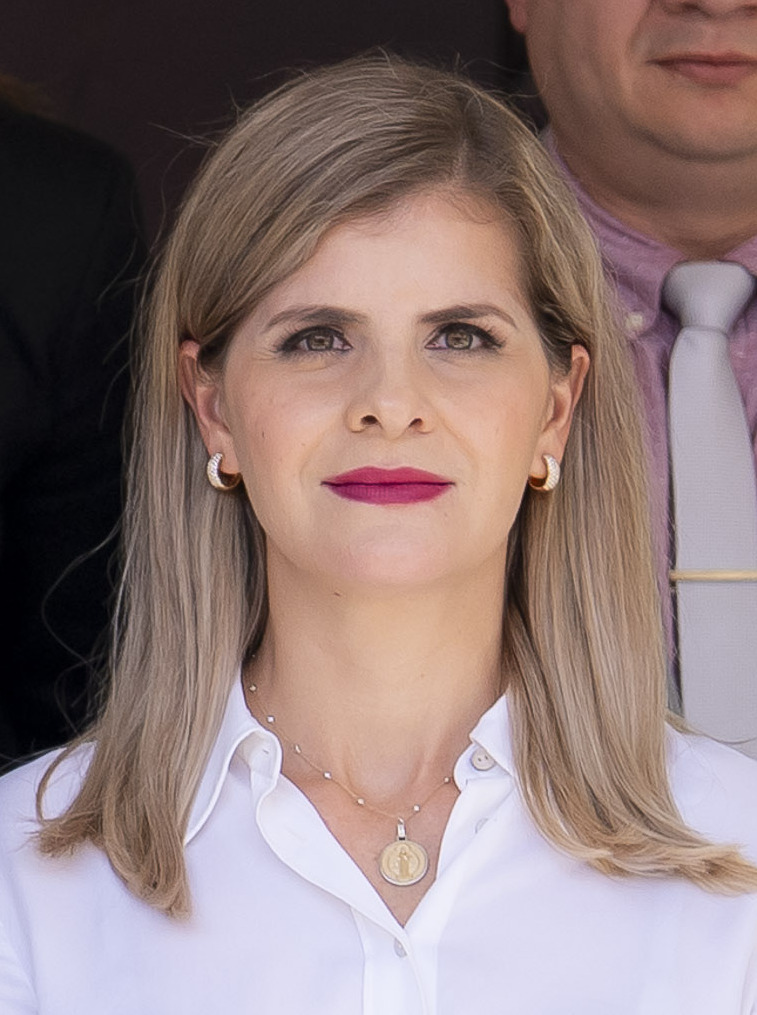
Laura Fernández Delgado
President

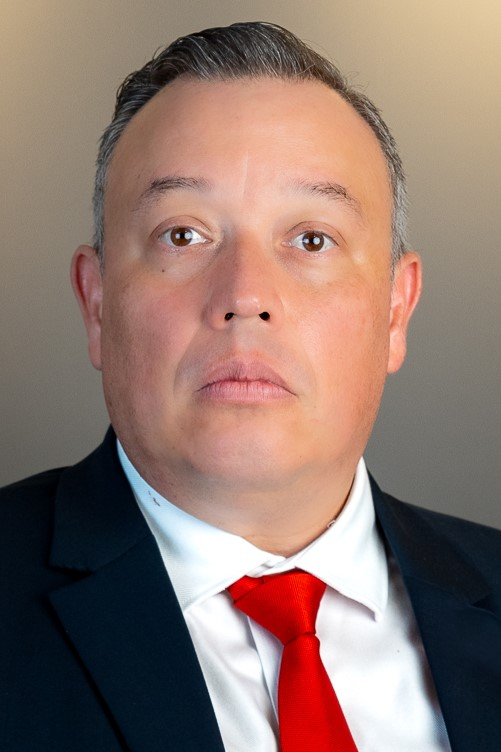
Francisco Gamboa
First Vice President

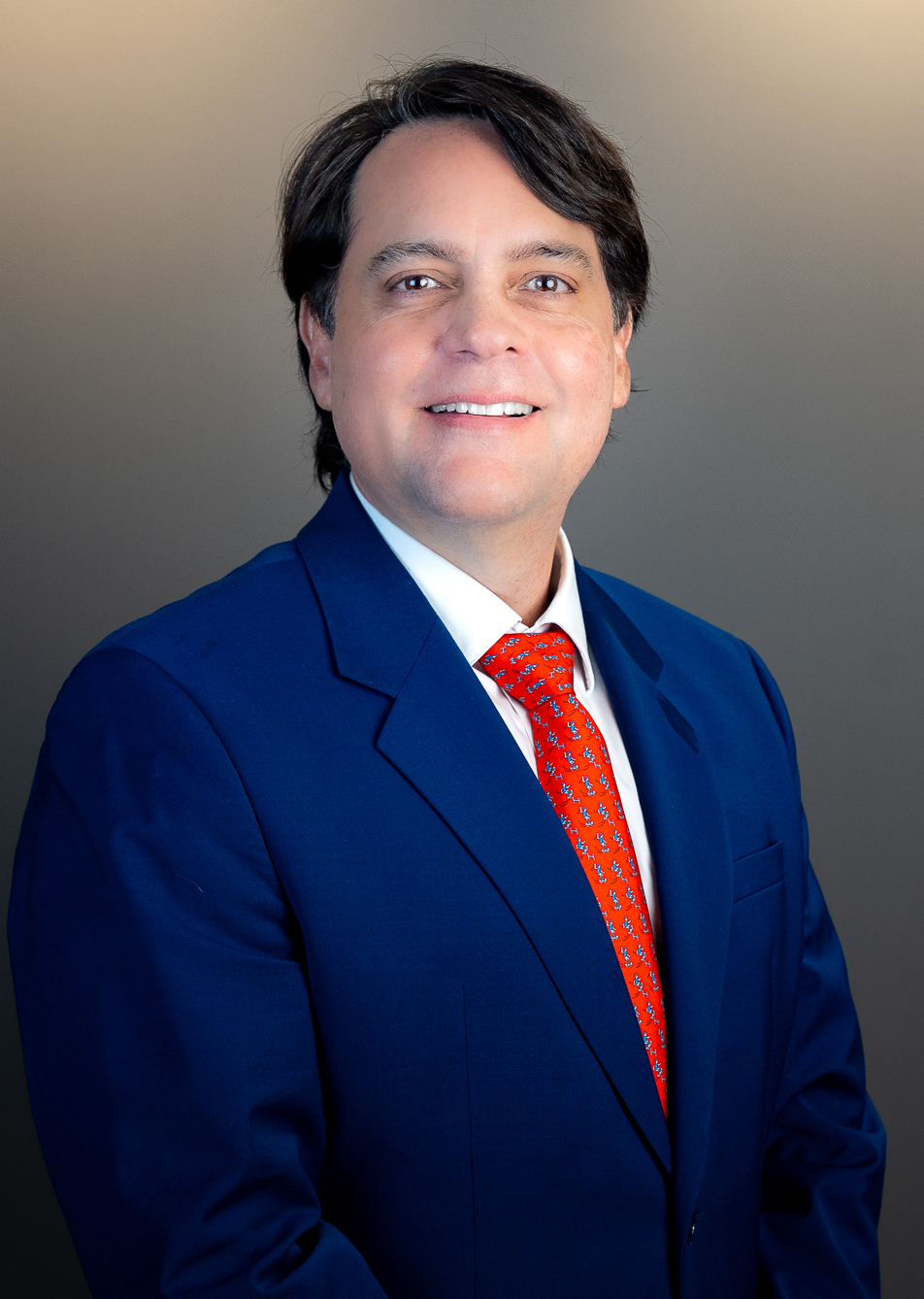
Douglas Soto
Second Vice President

Costa Rica is governed by the Costa Rican Constitution of 1949 which established a presidential system and a unitary state. Executive power is exercised by the President of Costa Rica, who is the head of state and head of government and is elected by direct, secret, and universal popular vote for a four-year term. Among the presidential powers are the appointment of the presidents of the Autonomous Institutions, the appointment or dismissal of Costa Rican ministers and diplomats, vetoing laws, signing decrees, pardoning sentences, establishing a national holiday, and national mourning. The current president is Laura Fernández Delgado, since 8 May 2026. She is accompanied by two vice presidents also elected by popular vote, Francisco Gamboa and Douglas Soto, both also assuming office on 8 May 2026.

Legislative power is vested by the Legislative Assembly of Costa Rica, a unicameral body with 57 deputies, responsible for approving, amending, or repealing laws and decrees. Legislators are elected by direct, secret, and universal popular vote for a four-year term and are provincial. Its current president is Rodrigo Arias Sánchez.

The judiciary is independent of the executive and the legislature. The country's highest court is the Supreme Court of Justice of Costa Rica. The Supreme Court of Justice is composed of 22 judges elected by the Legislative Assembly for an eight-year term. Its current president is Judge Orlando Aguirre. The Supreme Court of Justice is responsible for appointing the Magistrates who make up the Supreme Electoral Tribunal.

According to International IDEA's Global State of Democracy (GSoD) Indices and Democracy Tracker, Costa Rica performs in the high range on overall democratic measures, with particular strengths in freedom of religion, elected government, and freedom of movement.

=== Administrative divisions ===
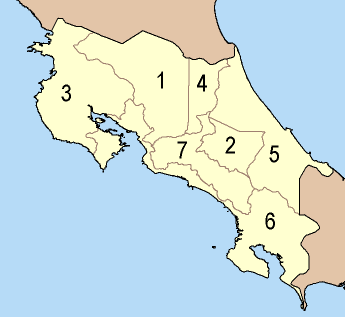
Provinces 1 Alajuela, 2 Cartago, 3 Guanacaste, 4 Heredia, 5 Limón, 6 Puntarenas, 7 San José

Costa Rica is composed of seven provinces, which in turn are divided into 82 cantons (Spanish: cantón, plural cantones), each of which is directed by a mayor. Mayors are chosen democratically every four years by each canton. There are no provincial legislatures. The cantons are further divided into 488 districts (distritos).

=== Foreign relations ===
Costa Rica is an active member of the United Nations and the Organization of American States. The Inter-American Court of Human Rights and the United Nations University of Peace are based in Costa Rica. It is also a member of many other international organizations related to human rights and democracy, such as the Community of Democracies. The main foreign policy objective of Costa Rica is to foster human rights and sustainable development as a way to secure stability and growth.

Costa Rica is a member of the International Criminal Court, without a Bilateral Immunity Agreement of protection for the United States military (as covered under Article 98). Costa Rica is an observer of the Organisation internationale de la Francophonie.

On 10 September 1961, some months after Fidel Castro declared Cuba a socialist state, Costa Rican President Mario Echandi ended diplomatic relations with Cuba through Executive Decree Number 2. This freeze lasted 47 years until President Óscar Arias Sánchez re-established normal relations on 18 March 2009, saying, "If we have been able to turn the page with regimes as profoundly different to our reality as occurred with the USSR or, more recently, with the Republic of China, how would we not do it with a country that is geographically and culturally much nearer to Costa Rica?" Arias announced that both countries would exchange ambassadors.

Costa Rica has a long-term disagreement with Nicaragua over the San Juan River, which defines the border between the two countries, and Costa Rica's rights of navigation on the river. On 14 July 2009, the International Court of Justice in the Hague upheld Costa Rica's navigation rights for commercial purposes to subsistence fishing on their side of the river. An 1858 treaty extended navigation rights to Costa Rica, but Nicaragua denied passenger travel and fishing were part of the deal; the court ruled Costa Ricans on the river were not required to have Nicaraguan tourist cards or visas as Nicaragua argued, but, in a nod to the Nicaraguans, ruled that Costa Rican boats and passengers must stop at the first and last Nicaraguan port along their route. They must also have an identity document or passport. Nicaragua can also impose timetables on Costa Rican traffic. Nicaragua may require Costa Rican boats to display the flag of Nicaragua but may not charge them for departure clearance from its ports. These were all specific items of contention brought to the court in the 2005 filing.

In 2010, there was also a dispute around Isla Calero, and the effects of Nicaraguan dredging of the river in that area.

On 1 June 2007, Costa Rica broke diplomatic ties with Taiwan, switching recognition to the People's Republic of China. Costa Rica was the first of the Central American nations to do so. President Óscar Arias Sánchez admitted the action was a response to economic exigency. In response, the PRC built a new, $100 million, state-of-the-art football stadium in Parque la Sabana, in the province of San José. Approximately 600 Chinese engineers and laborers took part in this project, and it was inaugurated in March 2011, with a match between the national teams of Costa Rica and China.

Costa Rica finished a term on the United Nations Security Council, having been elected for a nonrenewable, two-year term in the 2007 election. Its term expired on 31 December 2009; this was Costa Rica's third time on the Security Council. Elayne Whyte Gómez is the Permanent Representative of Costa Rica to the UN Office at Geneva (2017) and President of the United Nations Conference to Negotiate a Legally Binding Instrument to Prohibit Nuclear Weapons.

Costa Rica is the 58th most peaceful country in the world, according to the 2024 Global Peace Index.

=== Pacifism ===
On 1 December 1948, Costa Rica abolished its military force. In 1949, the abolition of the military was introduced in Article 12 of the Costa Rican Constitution. The budget previously dedicated to the military is now dedicated to providing health care services and education. According to Deutsche Welle, "Costa Rica is known for its stable democracy, progressive social policies, such as free, compulsory public education, high social well-being, and emphasis on environmental protection." For law enforcement, Costa Rica has the Public Force of Costa Rica police agency.

In 2017, Costa Rica signed the UN treaty on the Prohibition of Nuclear Weapons.

=== Leadership in world governance initiatives ===
Costa Rica has been one of the signatories of the agreement to convene a convention for drafting a world constitution. As a result, in 1968, for the first time in human history, a World Constituent Assembly convened to draft and adopt the Constitution for the Federation of Earth. Francisco Orlich Bolmarcich, then president of Costa Rica signed the agreement to convene a World Constituent Assembly along with former presidents José Figueres Ferrer and Otilio Ulate Blanco.

=== Environmentalism ===
In 2021, Costa Rica, alongside Denmark, launched the "Beyond Oil and Gas Alliance" (BOGA) to stop the use of fossil fuels. The BOGA campaign was presented in the COP26 Climate Summit, where Sweden joined as a core member, while New Zealand and Portugal joined as associate members.

== Economy ==
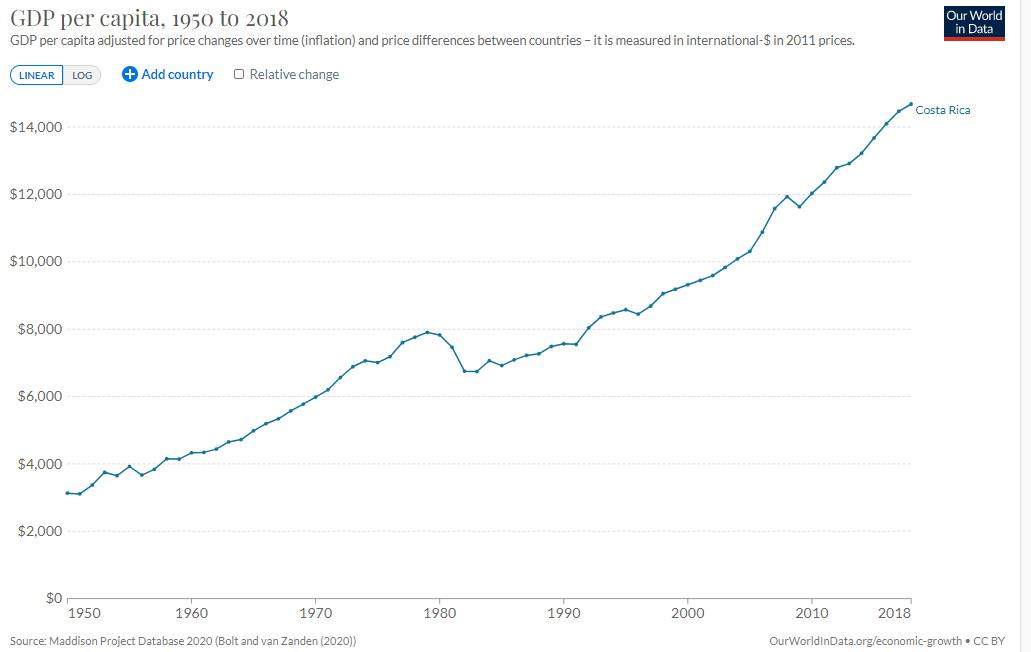
Real GDP per capita development in Costa Rica

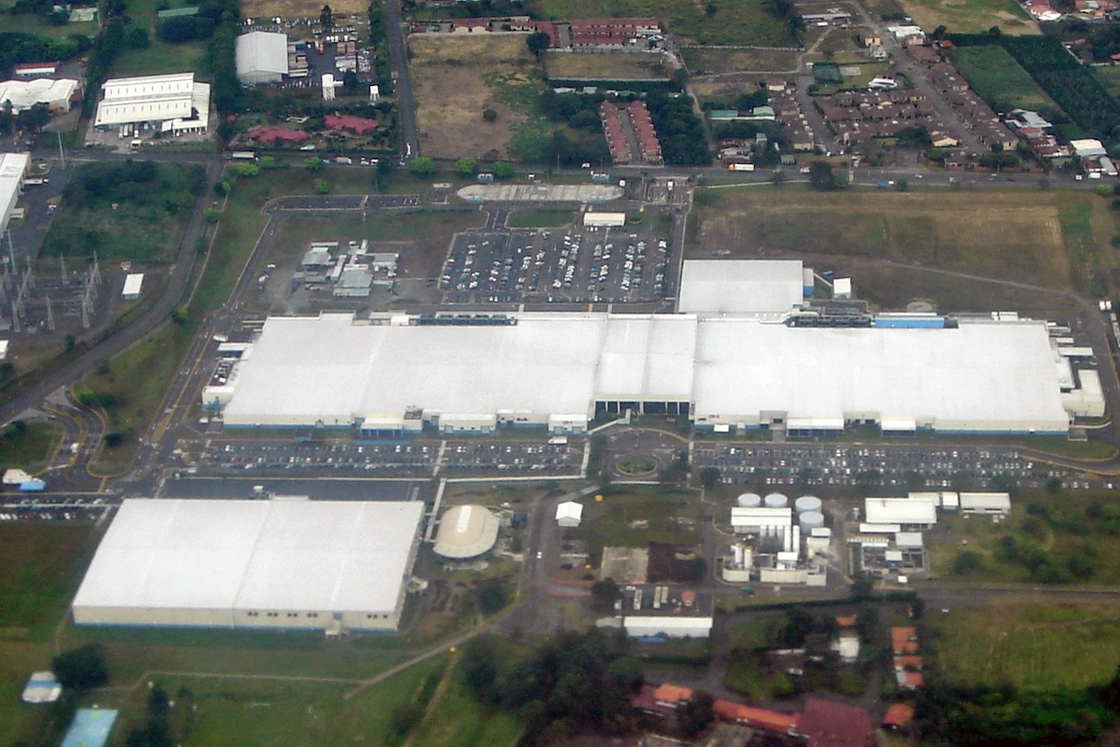
An Intel microprocessor facility in Costa Rica that was, at one time, responsible for 20% of Costa Rican exports and 5% of the country's GDP

Costa Rica's economy has shown resilience and growth in recent years. In 2024, the country's nominal GDP per capita was estimated at US$17,501, reflecting steady economic development.

The unemployment rate has also seen improvement, dropping to 6.9% in December 2024. This reduction suggests a recovering labor market and increased employment opportunities. Poverty levels have decreased, with the national poverty rate falling to 10.0% in 2024, the lowest in recent years. This improvement reflects successful social programs and economic inclusivity. In 2025, the World Bank reclassified Costa Rica as a high-income economy.

Costa Rica continues to prioritize renewable energy, with approximately 95% of its electricity generated from renewable sources in 2023. Hydropower accounts for the majority, followed by geothermal, wind, solar, and biomass energy. However, the country faced challenges due to drought conditions, leading to electricity rationing in 2024.

The government remains committed to environmental sustainability, implementing policies aimed at reducing greenhouse gas emissions and promoting clean energy initiatives. These efforts align with Costa Rica's goal of achieving net-zero carbon emissions by 2050.

=== Trade and foreign investment ===
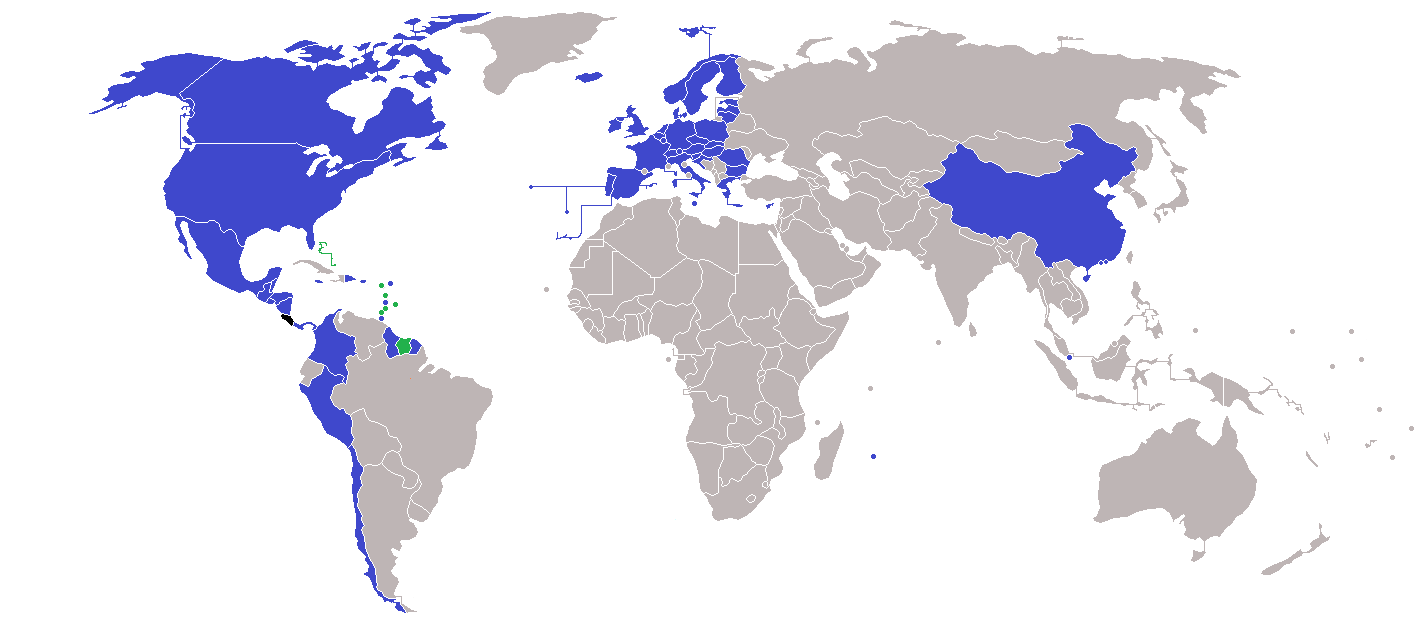
Countries (in blue) which have signed Free Trade Agreements with Costa Rica

Costa Rica has free trade agreements with many countries, including the US. There are no significant trade barriers that would affect imports and the country has been lowering its tariffs to other Central American countries. The country's Free Trade Zones (FTZ) provide incentives for manufacturing and service industries to operate in Costa Rica. In 2015, the zones supported over 82 thousand direct jobs and 43 thousand indirect jobs 2015, and average wages in the FTZ were 1.8 times greater than the average for private enterprise work in the rest of the country. In 2016, Amazon.com for example, had some 3,500 employees in Costa Rica and planned to increase that by 1,500 in 2017, making it an important employer.

The central location provides access to American markets and direct ocean access to Europe and Asia. The most important exports in 2015 (in order of dollar value) were medical instruments, bananas, tropical fruits, integrated circuits, and orthopedic appliances. Total imports in that year were US$15 billion. The most significant products imported in 2015 (in order of dollar value) were refined petroleum, automobiles, packaged medications, broadcasting equipment, and computers. The total exports were US$12.6 billion for a trade deficit of US$2.39 billion in 2015.

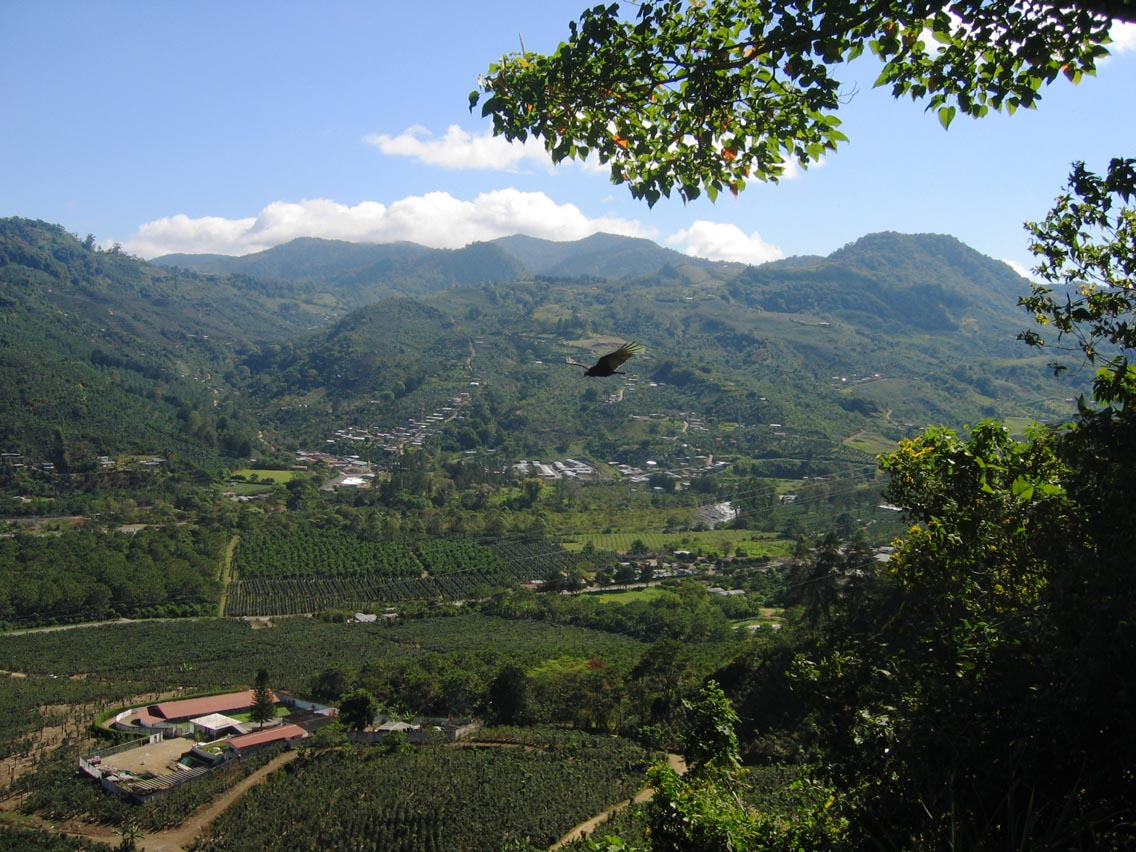
A coffee plantation in the Orosí Valley

Pharmaceuticals, financial outsourcing, software development, and ecotourism have become the prime industries in Costa Rica's economy. High levels of education among its residents make the country an attractive investment location. Since 1999, tourism earns more foreign exchange than the combined exports of the country's three main cash crops: bananas and pineapples especially, but also other crops, including coffee. Coffee production played a key role in Costa Rica's history and in 2006, was the third cash crop export. As a small country, Costa Rica now provides under 1% of the world's coffee production. In 2015, the value of coffee exports was US$305.9 million, a small part of the total agricultural exports of US$2.7 billion. Coffee production increased by 13.7% percent in 2015–16, declined by 17.5% in 2016–17 but was expected to increase by about 15% in the subsequent year.

Costa Rica has developed a system of payments for environmental services. Similarly, Costa Rica has a tax on water pollution to penalize businesses and homeowners that dump sewage, agricultural chemicals, and other pollutants into waterways. In May 2007, the Costa Rican government announced its intentions to become 100% carbon neutral by 2021. By 2015, 93 percent of the country's electricity came from renewable sources. In 2019, the country produced 99.62% of its electricity from renewable sources and ran completely on renewable sources for 300 continuous days.

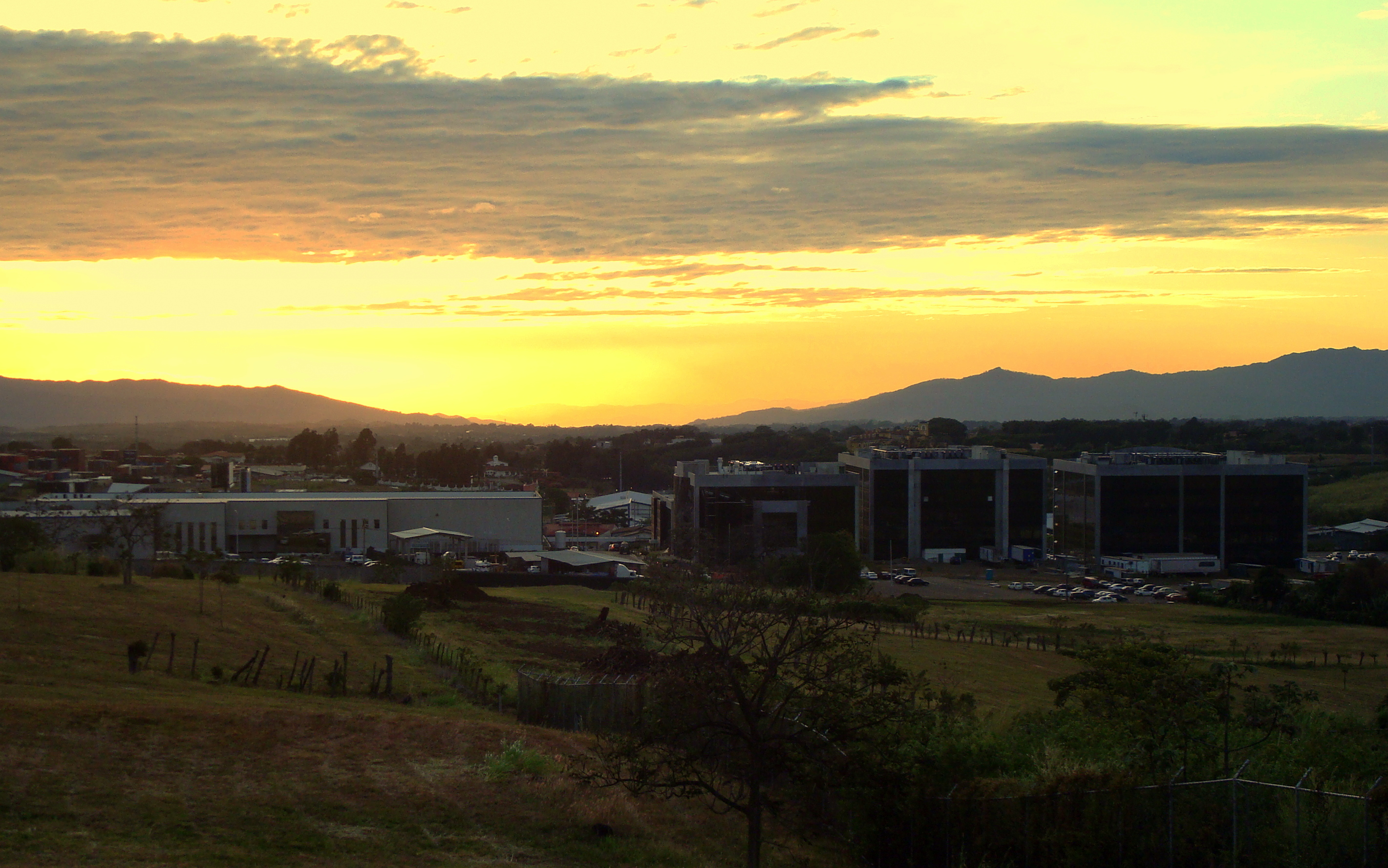
An industrial park in Heredia

In 1996, the Forest Law was enacted to provide direct financial incentives to landowners for the provision of environmental services. This helped reorient the forestry sector away from commercial timber production and the resulting deforestation and helped create awareness of the services it provides for the economy and society (i.e., carbon fixation, hydrological services such as producing fresh drinking water, biodiversity protection, and provision of scenic beauty).

A 2016 report by the U.S. government identifies other challenges facing Costa Rica as it works to expand its economy by working with companies from the US (and probably from other countries). The major concerns identified were as follows:

- The ports, roads, railways, and water delivery systems would benefit from major upgrading, a concern voiced by other reports too. Attempts by China to invest in upgrading such aspects were "stalled by bureaucratic and legal concerns".
- The bureaucracy is "often slow and cumbersome".

Mining in Costa Rica contributes a small amount to the economy. In 2018 5.2 tons of gold were produced.

=== Tourism ===
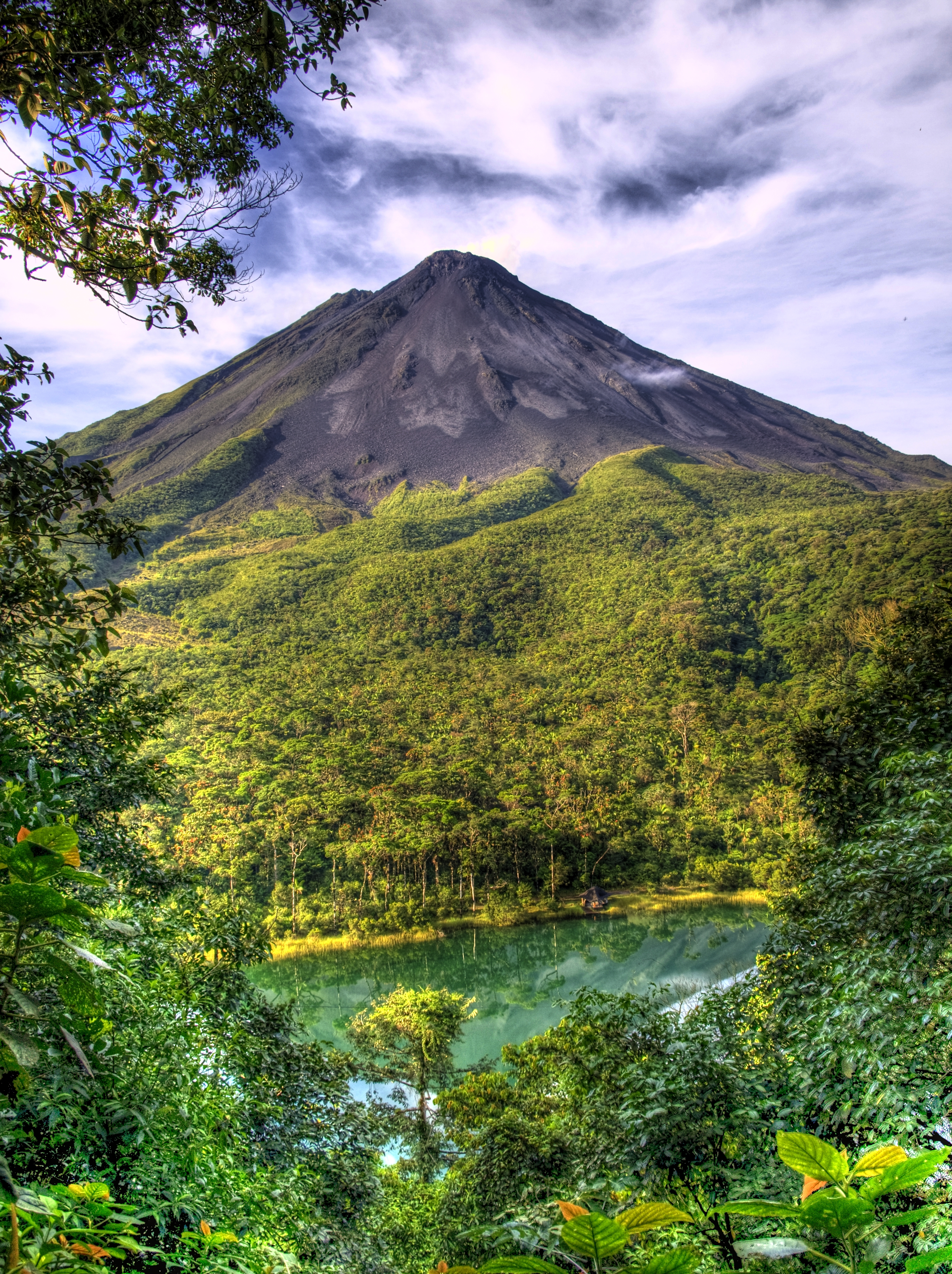
Arenal Volcano National Park is one of the country's tourist attractions.

Costa Rica had 2.9 million foreign visitors in 2016, up 10% from 2015. In 2015, the tourism sector was responsible for 5.8% of the country's GDP, or $3.4 billion. In 2016, the highest number of tourists came from the United States, with 1,000,000 visitors, followed by Europe with 434,884 arrivals. According to Costa Rica Vacations, once tourists arrive in the country, 22% go to Tamarindo, 18% go to Arenal, 17% pass through Liberia (where the Daniel Oduber Quirós International Airport is located), 16% go to San José, the country's capital (passing through Juan Santamaría International Airport), while 18% choose Manuel Antonio and 7% Monteverde.

By 2004, tourism was generating more revenue and foreign exchange than bananas and coffee combined. In 2016, the World Travel & Tourism Council's estimates indicated a direct contribution to the GDP of 5.1% and 110,000 direct jobs in Costa Rica; the total number of jobs indirectly supported by tourism was 271,000.

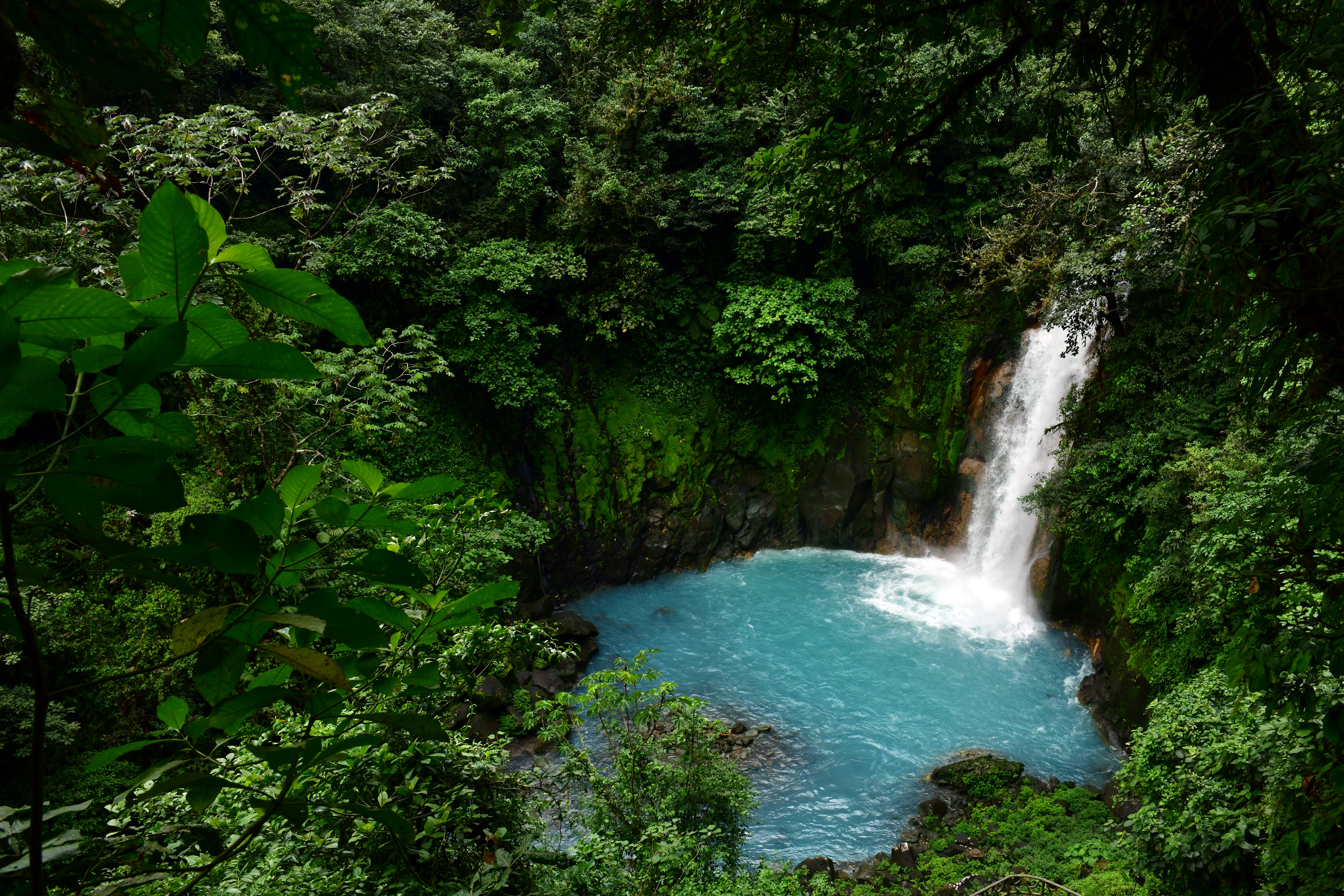
Waterfall in the Tenorio Volcano National Park

A pioneer of ecotourism, Costa Rica draws many tourists to its extensive series of national parks and other protected areas. The trail Camino de Costa Rica supports this by allowing travelers to walk across the country from the Atlantic to the Pacific coast. In the 2011 Travel and Tourism Competitiveness Index, Costa Rica ranked 44th in the world and second among Latin American countries after Mexico in 2011. By the time of the 2017 report, the country had reached 38th place, slightly behind Panama. The Ethical Traveler group's ten countries on their 2017 list of The World's Ten Best Ethical Destinations includes Costa Rica. The country scored highest in environmental protection among the winners. Costa Rica began reversing deforestation in the 1990s, and they are moving towards using only renewable energy, with 93% of all its energy being renewable.

== Demographics ==
Costa Rican Censuses
Year	Population	%±
1864	120,499	—
1883	182,073	51.1
1892	243,205	33.6
1927	471,524	93.9
1950	800,875	69.8
1963	1,336,274	66.9
1973	1,871,780	40.1
1984	2,416,809	29.1
2000	3,810,179	57.7
2011	4,301,712	12.9
2022	5,044,197	14.7

Racial groups in Costa Rica (2011 census)
1. White or Mestizos (83.6%)
2. Mulattos (6.72%)
3. Indigenous (2.42%)
4. Blacks (1.05%)
5. East Asians (0.21%)
6. Not specified (5.95%)

The 2022 census counted a total population of 5,044,197 people. In 2022, the census also recorded ethnic or racial identity for all groups separately for the first time in more than ninety-five years since the 1927 census. Options included Indigenous, Black or Afro-descendant, Mulatto, Chinese, Mestizo, white and other on section IV: question 7. In 2011 data for the following groups were: 83.6% whites or mestizos, 6.7% mulattoes, 2.4% Native American, 1.1% black or Afro-Caribbean; the census showed 1.1% as Other, 2.9% (141,304 people) as None, and 2.2% (107,196 people) as unspecified.

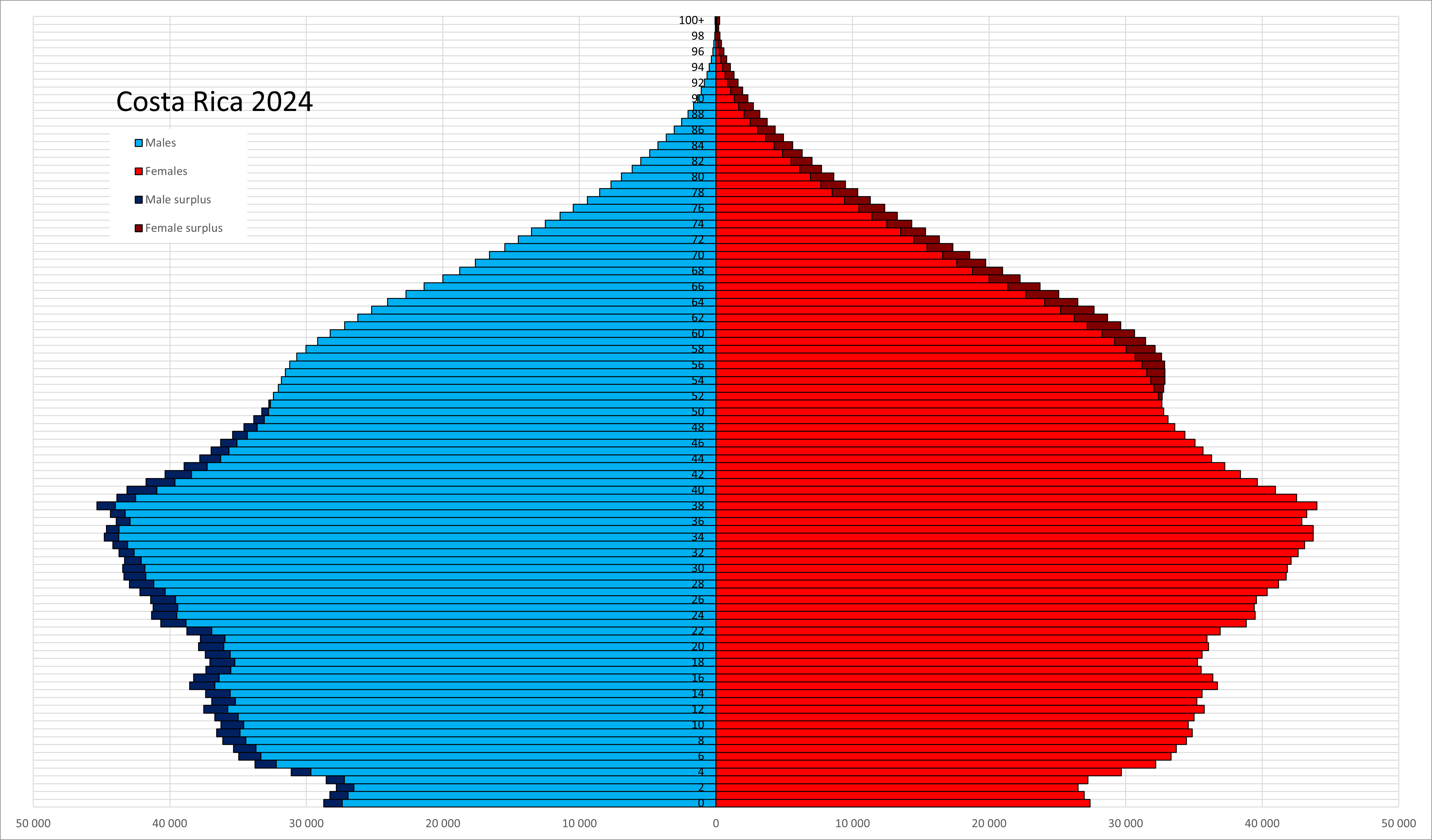
Population pyramid of Costa Rica for 2024

In 2011, there were over 104,000 Native American or indigenous inhabitants, representing 2.4% of the population. Most of them live in secluded reservations, distributed among eight ethnic groups: Quitirrisí (in the Central Valley), Matambú or Chorotega (Guanacaste), Maleku (northern Alajuela), Bribri (southern Atlantic), Cabécar (Cordillera de Talamanca), Ngäbe (southern Costa Rica, along the Panamá border), Boruca (southern Costa Rica) and Térraba (southern Costa Rica).

The population includes European Costa Ricans (of European ancestry), primarily of Spanish descent, with significant numbers of Italian, German, English, Dutch, French, Irish, Portuguese, and Polish families, as well a sizable Jewish community. The majority of the Afro-Costa Ricans are Creole English-speaking descendants of 19th century black Jamaican immigrant workers.

The 2011 census classified 83.6% of the population as white or Mestizo; the latter are persons of combined European and Amerindian descent. The Mulatto segment (mix of white and black) represented 6.7% and Indigenous people made up 2.4% of the population. Native and European mixed-blood populations are far less than in other Latin American countries. In Guanacaste, almost half the population is visibly mestizo, a legacy of the more pervasive unions between Spanish colonists and Chorotega Amerindians through several generations. Limón is where the vast majority of the Afro-Costa Rican community lives.

Costa Rica hosts many refugees, mainly from Colombia and Nicaragua. As a result of that and illegal immigration, an estimated 10–15% (400,000–600,000) of the Costa Rican population is made up of Nicaraguans. Some Nicaraguans migrate for seasonal work opportunities and then return to their country. Costa Rica took in many refugees from a range of other Latin American countries fleeing civil wars and dictatorships during the 1970s and 1980s, notably from Chile and Argentina, as well as people from El Salvador who fled from guerrillas and government death squads.

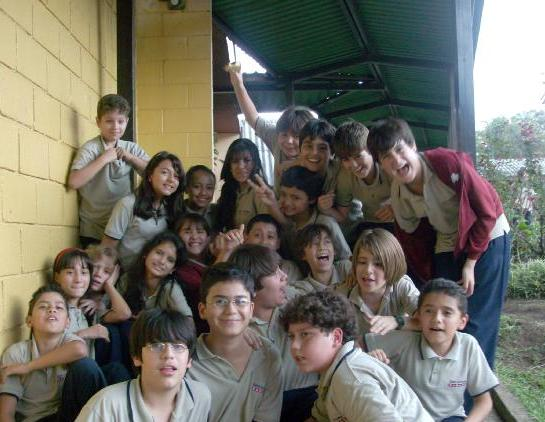
Costa Rican school children

According to the World Bank, in 2010 about 489,200 immigrants lived in the country, many from Nicaragua, Panama, El Salvador, Honduras, Guatemala, and Belize, while 125,306 Costa Ricans live abroad in the United States, Panama, Nicaragua, Spain, Mexico, Canada, Germany, Venezuela, Dominican Republic, and Ecuador. The number of migrants declined in later years but in 2015, there were some 420,000 immigrants in Costa Rica and the number of asylum seekers (mostly from Honduras, El Salvador, Guatemala and Nicaragua) rose to more than 110,000, a fivefold increase from 2012. In 2016, the country was called a "magnet" for migrants from South and Central America and other countries who were hoping to reach the U.S.

=== Largest cantons ===
Largest cantons in Costa Rica Estimations from 2022
Rank	Name	Province	Pop.
1	San José	San José	352 381
2	Alajuela	Alajuela	322 143
3	Desamparados	San José	223 226
4	San Carlos	Alajuela	198 742
5	Cartago	Cartago	165 417
6	Pérez Zeledón	San José	156 917
7	Pococí	Limón	146 320
8	Puntarenas	Puntarenas	141 697
9	Goicoechea	San José	132 104
10	Heredia	Heredia	131 901

=== Languages ===
The primary language spoken in Costa Rica is Spanish, which features characteristics distinct to the country, a form of Central American Spanish. Costa Rica is a linguistically diverse country and home to at least five living local indigenous languages spoken by the descendants of pre-Columbian peoples: Maléku, Cabécar, Bribri, Guaymí, and Buglere.

Of native languages still spoken, primarily in indigenous reservations, the most numerically important are the Bribri, Maléku, Cabécar and Ngäbere languages; some of these have several thousand speakers in Costa Rica while others have a few hundred. Some languages, such as Teribe and Boruca, have fewer than a thousand speakers. The Buglere language and the closely related Guaymí are spoken by some in southeast Puntarenas.

A Creole-English language, Jamaican patois (also known as Mekatelyu), is an English-based Creole language spoken by the Afro-Carib immigrants who have settled primarily in Limón Province along the Caribbean coast.

About 10.7% of Costa Rica's adult population (18 or older) also speaks English, 0.7% French, and 0.3% speaks Portuguese or German as a second language.

=== Religion ===
Religion in Costa Rica (CIEP 2018)
1. Catholicism (52.0%)
2. Protestantism (25.0%)
3. No religion (17.0%)
4. Other religions (3.00%)
5. No answer (3.00%)

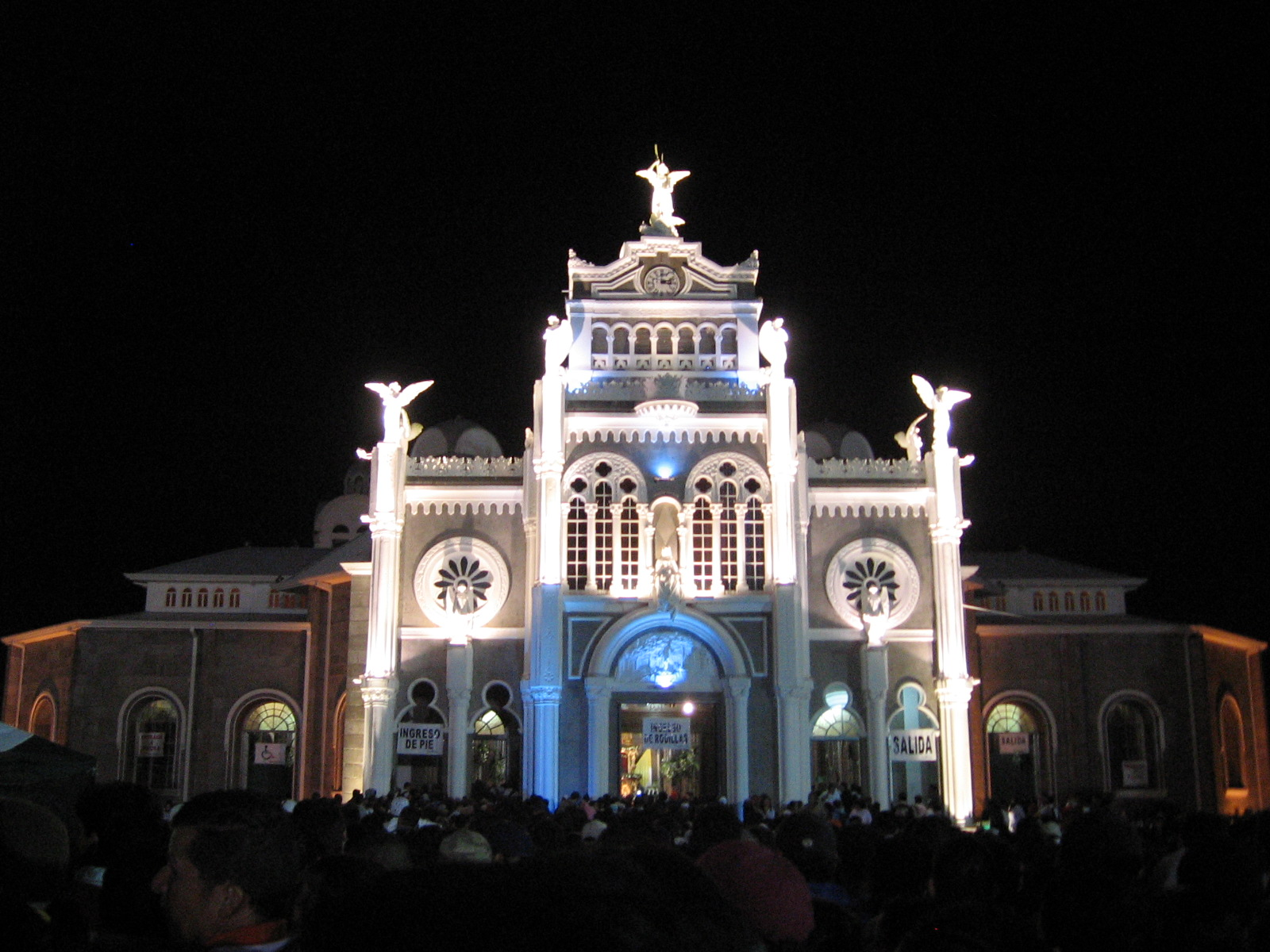
Basílica de Nuestra Señora de los Ángeles (Basilica of Our Lady of the Angels, Cartago), during the 2007 pilgrimage

Most Costa Ricans identify with a Christian religion, with Catholicism being the one with the largest number of members and also the official state religion according to the 1949 Constitution, which at the same time guarantees freedom of religion. Costa Rica is the only modern state in the Americas which currently has Catholicism as its state religion; other countries with state religions (Catholic, Lutheran, Anglican, Orthodox) are in Europe: Liechtenstein, Monaco, the Vatican City, Malta, United Kingdom, Denmark, Iceland, and Greece.

The Latinobarómetro survey of 2017 found that 57% of the population identify themselves as Roman Catholics, 25% are Evangelical Protestants, 15% report that they do not have a religion, and 2% declare that they belong to another religion. This survey indicated a decline in the share of Catholics and rise in the share of Protestants and irreligious. A University of Costa Rica survey of 2018 showed similar rates; 52% Catholics, 22% Protestants, 17% irreligious, and 3% other. The rate of secularism is high by Latin American standards.

Due to small, but continuous, immigration from Asia and the Middle East, other religions have grown. The most popular is Buddhism, with about 100,000 practitioners (over 2% of the population). Many Buddhists are members of the Han Chinese community of about 40,000 with additional new local converts. There is also a small Muslim community of about 500 families or 0.001% of the population.

The Sinagoga Shaarei Zion synagogue is near La Sabana Metropolitan Park in San José. Several homes in the neighborhood east of the park display the Star of David and other Jewish symbols.

The Church of Jesus Christ of Latter-day Saints claims more than 35,000 members, and has a temple in San José that served as a regional worship center for Costa Rica. They represent less than 1% of the population.

=== Education ===
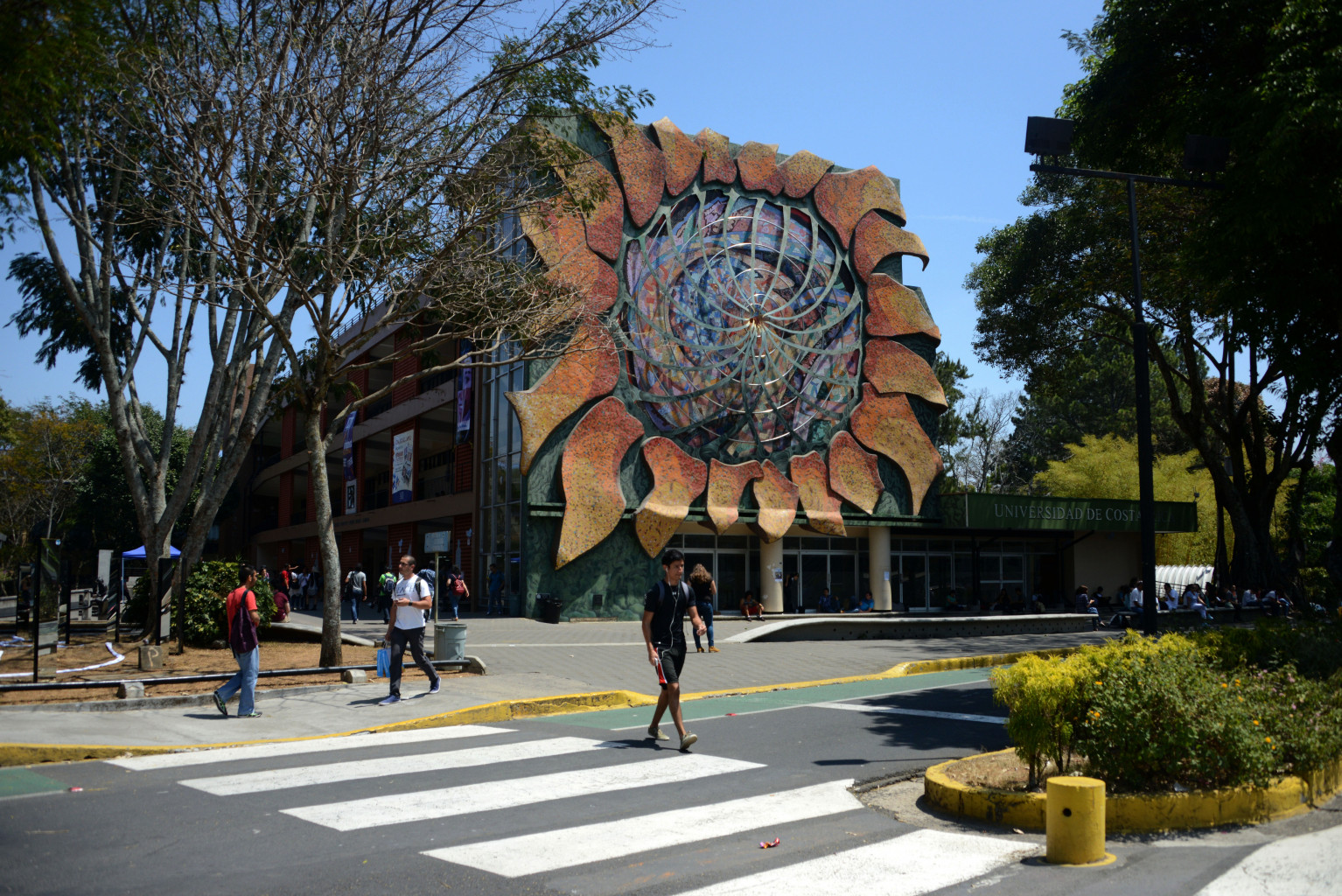
The University of Costa Rica is the largest university in the country and one of the most recognizable across Central America.

The literacy rate in Costa Rica is approximately 97 percent and English is widely spoken primarily due to Costa Rica's tourism industry. When the army was abolished in 1949, it was said that the "army would be replaced with an army of teachers". Universal public education is guaranteed in the constitution; primary education is obligatory, and both preschool and secondary school are free. Students who finish 11th grade receive a Costa Rican Bachillerato Diploma accredited by the Costa Rican Ministry of Education.

There are both state and private universities. The state-funded University of Costa Rica has been awarded the title "Meritorious Institution of Costa Rican Education and Culture" and hosts around 25,000 students who study at numerous campuses established around the country.

A 2016 report by the U.S. government report identifies the current challenges facing the education system, including the high dropout rate among secondary school students. The country needs even more workers who are fluent in English and languages such as Portuguese, Mandarin, and French. It would also benefit from more graduates in science, technology, engineering, and mathematics (STEM) programs, according to the report. Costa Rica was ranked 72nd in the Global Innovation Index in 2025.

=== Health ===
Development of life expectancy in Costa Rica

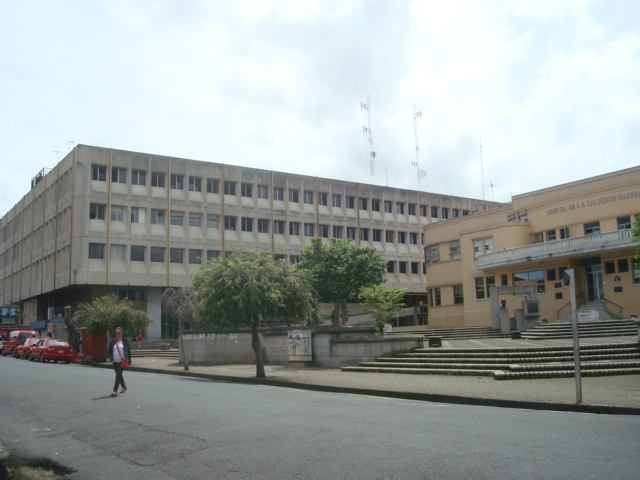
Hospital Calderón Guardia, named after the president who instituted universal health care across the country in 1941

According to the UNDP, in 2010, the life expectancy at birth for Costa Ricans was 79.3 years. The Nicoya Peninsula is considered one of the Blue Zones in the world, where people commonly live active lives past the age of 100 years. The New Economics Foundation (NEF) ranked Costa Rica first in its 2009 Happy Planet Index, and once again in 2012. The index measures the health and happiness they produce per unit of environmental input. According to NEF, Costa Rica's lead is due to its very high life expectancy which is second highest in the Americas, and higher than the United States. The country also experienced well-being higher than many richer nations and a per capita ecological footprint one-third the size of the United States'.

In 2002, there were 0.58 new general practitioner (medical) consultations 0.33 new specialist consultations per capita, and a hospital admission rate of 8.1%. Preventive health care is also successful. In 2002, 96% of Costa Rican women used some form of contraception, and antenatal care services were provided to 87% of all pregnant women. All children under one have access to well-baby clinics, and the immunization coverage rate in 2020 was above 95% for all antigens. Costa Rica has a very low malaria incidence of 48 per 100,000 in 2000 and no reported cases of measles in 2002. The perinatal mortality rate dropped from 12.0 per 1000 in 1972 to 5.4 per 1000 in 2001.

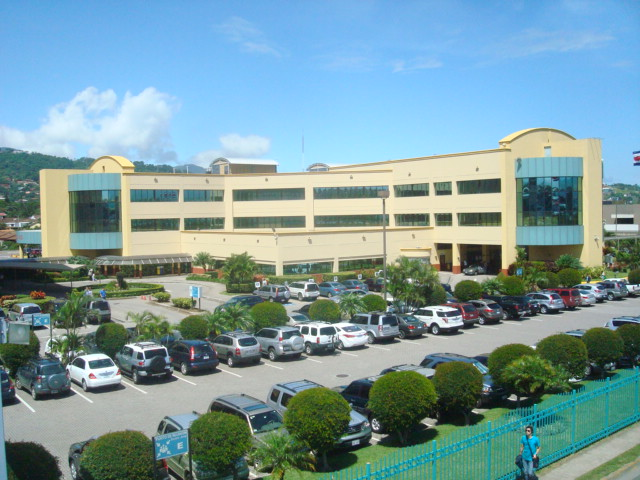
Hospital CIMA in Escazú

Costa Rica has been cited as Central America's great health success story. Its healthcare system is ranked higher than that of the United States, despite Costa Rica's much lower GDP. Before 1940, government hospitals and charities provided most health care. But since the 1941 creation of the Social Insurance Administration (Caja Costarricense de Seguro Social – CCSS), Costa Rica has provided universal health care to its wage-earning residents, with coverage extended to dependants over time. In 1973, the CCSS took over administration of all 29 of the country's public hospitals and all health care, also launching a Rural Health Program (Programa de Salud Rural) for primary care in rural areas, later extended to primary care services nationwide. In 1993, laws were passed to enable elected health boards that represented health consumers, social insurance representatives, employers, and social organizations. By 2000, social health insurance coverage was available to 82% of the Costa Rican population. Each health committee manages an area equivalent to one of the 83 administrative cantons of Costa Rica. There is limited use of private, for-profit services (around 14.4% of the national total health expenditure). About 7% of GDP is allocated to the health sector, and over 70% is government-funded.

Primary health care facilities in Costa Rica include health clinics, with a general practitioner, nurse, clerk, pharmacist, and a primary health technician. In 2008, there were five specialty national hospitals, three general national hospitals, seven regional hospitals, 13 peripheral hospitals, and 10 major clinics serving as referral centers for primary care clinics, which also deliver biopsychosocial services, family and community medical services, and promotion and prevention programs. Patients can choose private health care to avoid waiting lists.

Costa Rica is among the Latin American countries that have become popular destinations for medical tourism. In 2006, Costa Rica received 150,000 foreigners that came for medical treatment. Costa Rica is particularly attractive to Americans due to geographic proximity, high quality of medical services, and lower medical costs.

In the 2024 Global Hunger Index, Costa Rica is one of 22 countries with a GHI score of less than 5.

== Culture ==
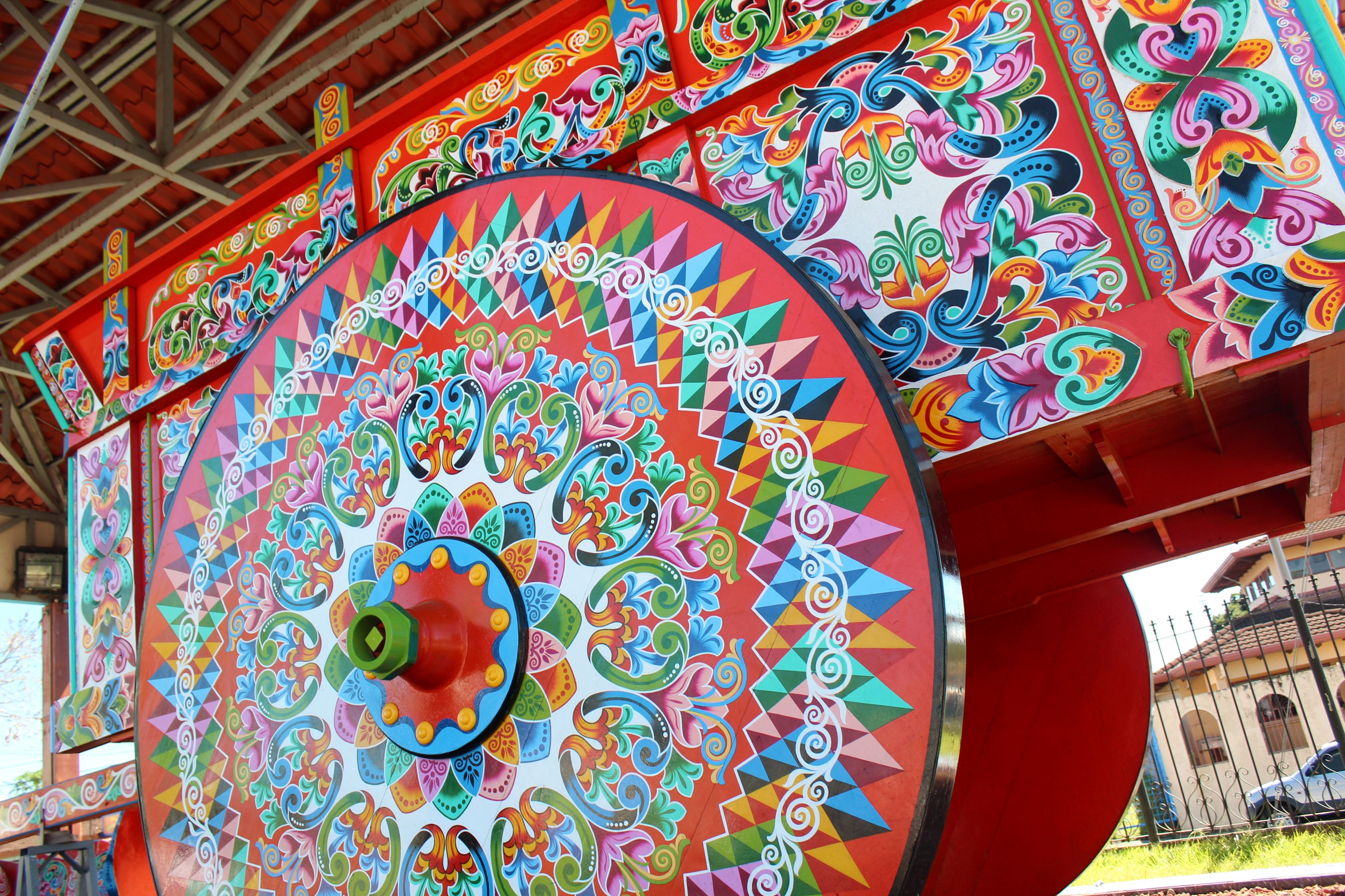
Las Carretas (oxcarts) are a national symbol.

Costa Rica was the point where the Mesoamerican and South American native cultures met. The northwest of the country, the Nicoya peninsula, was the southernmost point of Nahuatl cultural influence when the Spanish conquerors (conquistadores) came in the 16th century. The central and southern portions of the country had Chibcha influences. The Atlantic coast, meanwhile, was populated with African workers during the 17th and 18th centuries.

As a result of the immigration of Spaniards, their 16th-century Spanish culture and its evolution marked everyday life and culture until today, with the Spanish language and the Catholic religion as primary influences.

The Department of Culture, Youth, and Sports is in charge of the promotion and coordination of cultural life. The work of the department is divided into the Direction of Culture, Visual Arts, Scenic Arts, Music, Patrimony, and the System of Libraries. Permanent programs, such as the National Symphony Orchestra of Costa Rica and the Youth Symphony Orchestra, are conjunctions of two areas of work: Culture and Youth.

Dance-oriented genres, such as soca, salsa, bachata, merengue, cumbia and Costa Rican swing, are enjoyed increasingly by older rather than younger people. The guitar is popular, especially as an accompaniment to folk dances; however, the marimba was made the national instrument.

In November 2017, National Geographic magazine named Costa Rica as the happiest country in the world, and the country routinely ranks high in various happiness metrics. The article included this summary: "Costa Ricans enjoy the pleasure of living daily life to the fullest in a place that mitigates stress and maximizes joy". It is not surprising then that one of the most recognizable phrases among "Ticos" is "Pura Vida", pure life in a literal translation. It reflects the inhabitant's philosophy of life, denoting a simple life, free of stress, a positive, relaxed feeling. The expression is used in various contexts in conversation. Often, people walking down the streets, or buying food at shops say hello by saying Pura Vida. It can be phrased as a question or as an acknowledgment of one's presence. A recommended response to "How are you?" would be "Pura Vida." In that usage, it might be translated as "awesome", indicating that all is very well. When used as a question, the connotation would be "everything is going well?" or "how are you?".

Costa Rica rates 12th on the 2017 Happy Planet Index in the World Happiness Report by the UN; however, the country is said to be the happiest in Latin America. Reasons include the high level of social services, the caring nature of its inhabitants, long life expectancy and relatively low corruption.

=== Cuisine ===
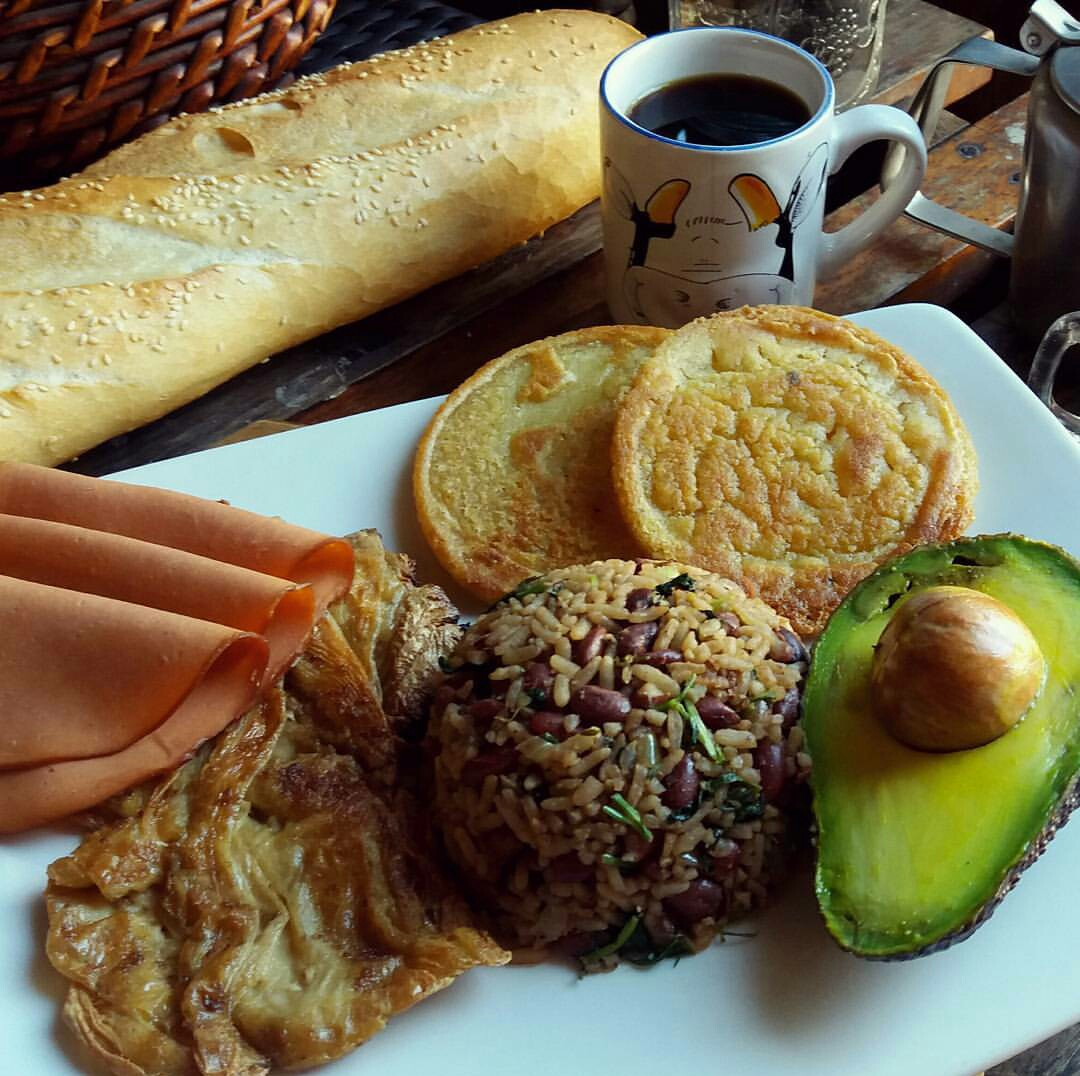
Costa Rican breakfast with gallo pinto

Costa Rican cuisine is a blend of Native American, Spanish, African, and many other cuisines. Dishes such as the very traditional tamale and many others made of corn are the most representative of its indigenous inhabitants, and similar to other neighboring Mesoamerican countries. Spaniards brought many new ingredients to the country from other lands, especially spices and domestic animals. Later in the 19th century, the African flavor lent its presence with influence from other Caribbean mixed flavors. This is how Costa Rican cuisine today is very varied, with every new ethnic group who had recently become part of the country's population influencing the country's cuisine.

=== Sports ===
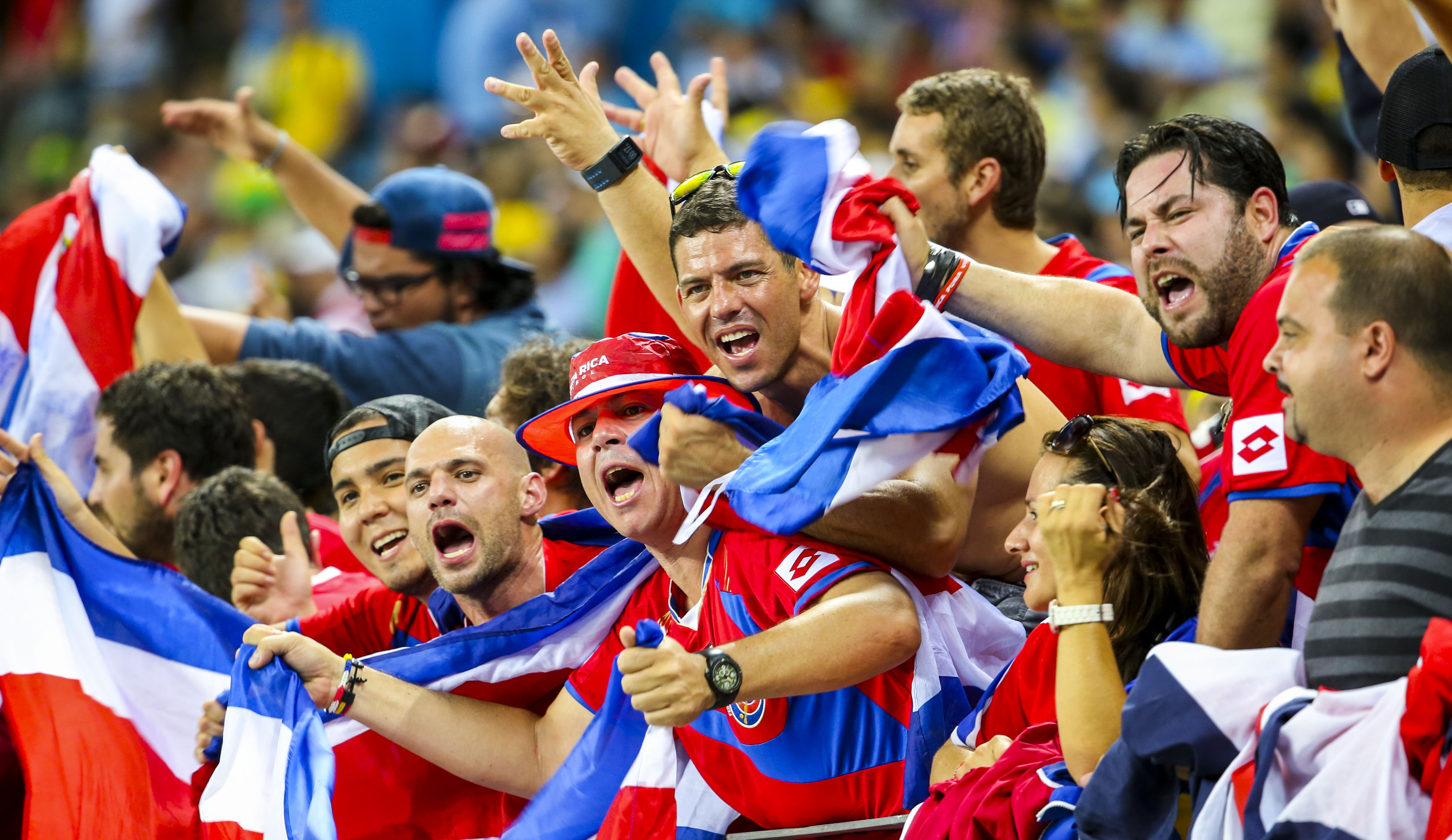
Costa Rica supporters at the 2014 FIFA World Cup in Brazil

Costa Rica entered the Summer Olympics for the first time in 1936. The sisters Silvia and Claudia Poll have won all four of the country's Olympic Medals for swimming; one Gold, one Silver, and two Bronze.

Football is the most popular sport in Costa Rica. The national team has played in five FIFA World Cup tournaments and reached the quarter-finals for the first time in 2014. Its best performance in the regional CONCACAF Gold Cup was runner-up in 2002. Paulo Wanchope, a forward who played for three clubs in England's Premier League in the late 1990s and early 2000s, is credited with enhancing foreign recognition of Costa Rican football. Costa Rica, along with Panama, was granted the hosting rights of 2020 FIFA U-20 Women's World Cup, which was postponed until 2021, due to the COVID-19 pandemic. On 17 November 2020, FIFA announced that the event would be held in Costa Rica in 2022.

As of late 2021, Costa Rica's women's national volleyball team has been the top team in Central America's AFECAVOL (Asociación de Federaciones CentroAmericanas de Voleibol) zone. Costa Rica featured a women's national team in beach volleyball that competed at the 2018–2020 NORCECA Beach Volleyball Continental Cup.

== See also ==
- Outline of Costa Rica
- Camino de Costa Rica – Trail across the country from the Atlantic to the Pacific coast
