= Telephone numbers in Costa Rica =

Telephone country code: 506

International Call Prefix: 00

As of 2010 the government body in charge of allocations is the Superintendencia de Telecomunicaciones SUTEL.

== History of allocations ==
Prefix 00 was reserved for international calls, while prefix 9 was assigned to special numbers, such as 911. Toll-free numbers start with 800 followed by 7 digits while premium-rate numbers start with 900 followed by 7 digits.

Before 1994, all phone numbers in Costa Rica were six digits long. The Instituto Costarricense de Electricidad, which at that time had the monopoly on telecommunications, introduced a system in which the telephone numbers in every province were assigned a prefix to make them 7 digits long. This numbering system was effective for some time. However, the boom of mobile phone customers since the introduction of GSM around 2000 and the expansion of metropolitan areas caused a serious shortage of available numbers. Thus many GSM-based customers used numbers starting with 3 and many residents of San Jose province had telephone numbers starting with prefixes other than 2.

Since March 20, 2008, a renewed numbering system added the prefix 2 for all landlines and 8 for all mobile phone numbers. This system was implemented in order to face the introduction of 1.5 million 3G W-CDMA customers in Q1 2009. The transition to 8-digit numbers was heavily publicized in Costa Rican media. However, the change caused considerable confusion among foreigners. Also, all calls dialed using the old 7-digit version of the phone number are automatically redirected to a voice message with information about the change.

In 2010, after the end of the government monopoly in telecommunications, prefixes 3, 4, 5, 6 and 7 were assigned to private operators.

8-digit numbers are commonly written one of two ways: "xxxxxxxx" or "xxxx-xxxx"

== Current Costa Rica number plan ==
Number Range	Type of Service	Province	Provider
21XX-XXXX	VoIP	Countrywide	Kölbi
22XX-XXXX	Fixed	San Jose and Heredia	GrupoICE
24XX-XXXX	Fixed	Alajuela	GrupoICE
25XX-XXXX	Fixed	Cartago, San Jose and Heredia	GrupoICE
2511-XXXX	Fixed	Reserved to Universidad de Costa Rica	GrupoICE
26XX-XXXX	Fixed	Guanacaste, Central and North Puntarenas	GrupoICE
27XX-XXXX	Fixed	Limon and South Puntarenas Province	GrupoICE
3XXX-XXXX	Reserved for private mobile services	Countrywide	Unallocated
4XXX-XXXX	VoIP	Countrywide	Multiple private operators
4070-XXXX	VoIP	Countrywide	InterPhone
500X-XXXX to 504X-XXXX	Mobile GSM	Countrywide	MVNO's
570X-XXXX to 571X-XXXX	Mobile GSM	Countrywide	Tuyo
6XXX-XXXX	Mobile GSM	Countrywide	Liberty
7XXX-XXXX	Mobile GSM	Countrywide	Claro
8XXX-XXXX	Mobile GSM	Countrywide	GrupoICE - Kölbi

== Special Costa Rica numbers ==
Class	Length or Range	Type	Example
Special Services	1XXX	Service Provider, Government and Services	1110, 1113, 1115, 1118, 1119, 1124, 1134, 1155, 1187, 1193, 1197, 1199, 1719, 1720
Special Services	18XX,19XX	Outbound call operator selection	1901, 1902, 1903, 1908
SMS Services	4 Digit	3rd Party SMS Content Providers	7777
800 Toll Free Numbers	10 Digits	3rd Party Company or Organization	800-286-0101
900 and 905 Premium-Toll Numbers	10 Digits	3rd Party Company or Organization	900-365-4632

== Sources ==
- SUTEL Registro de Numeración (In Spanish)
- SUTEL Plan Nacional de Numeración (In Spanish)
